= Berliner Anweisungen =

Set of bibliographical cataloging rules in Germany

The Berliner Anweisungen or BA (English: Berlin instructions), short for Anweisung für den alphabetischen Katalog der Volksbüchereien (English: Instructions for the alphabetical catalog of the public libraries) were a set of bibliographical cataloging rules for public libraries in Germany.

They were developed from 1938 to 1942, built on the much more complicated Preußische Instruktionen (PI) (English: Prussian instructions) created for scientific libraries in 1899 and expanded by DIN 1505 in 1932.

Since 1976/1977, public libraries in Germany-speaking countries work with the Regeln für die alphabetische Katalogisierung (RAK-ÖB) set of rules, which were based on the Paris Principles (PP) introduced in 1961 and the International Standard Bibliographic Description (ISBD) as of 1971. RAK in turn is in the process of being superseded by the adoption of Resource Description and Access (RDA) since 2015.

== See also ==
- Anglo-American Cataloging Rules (AACR)
- Breslauer Instructionen
- Library catalog
