= Publication =

Content made available to the general public

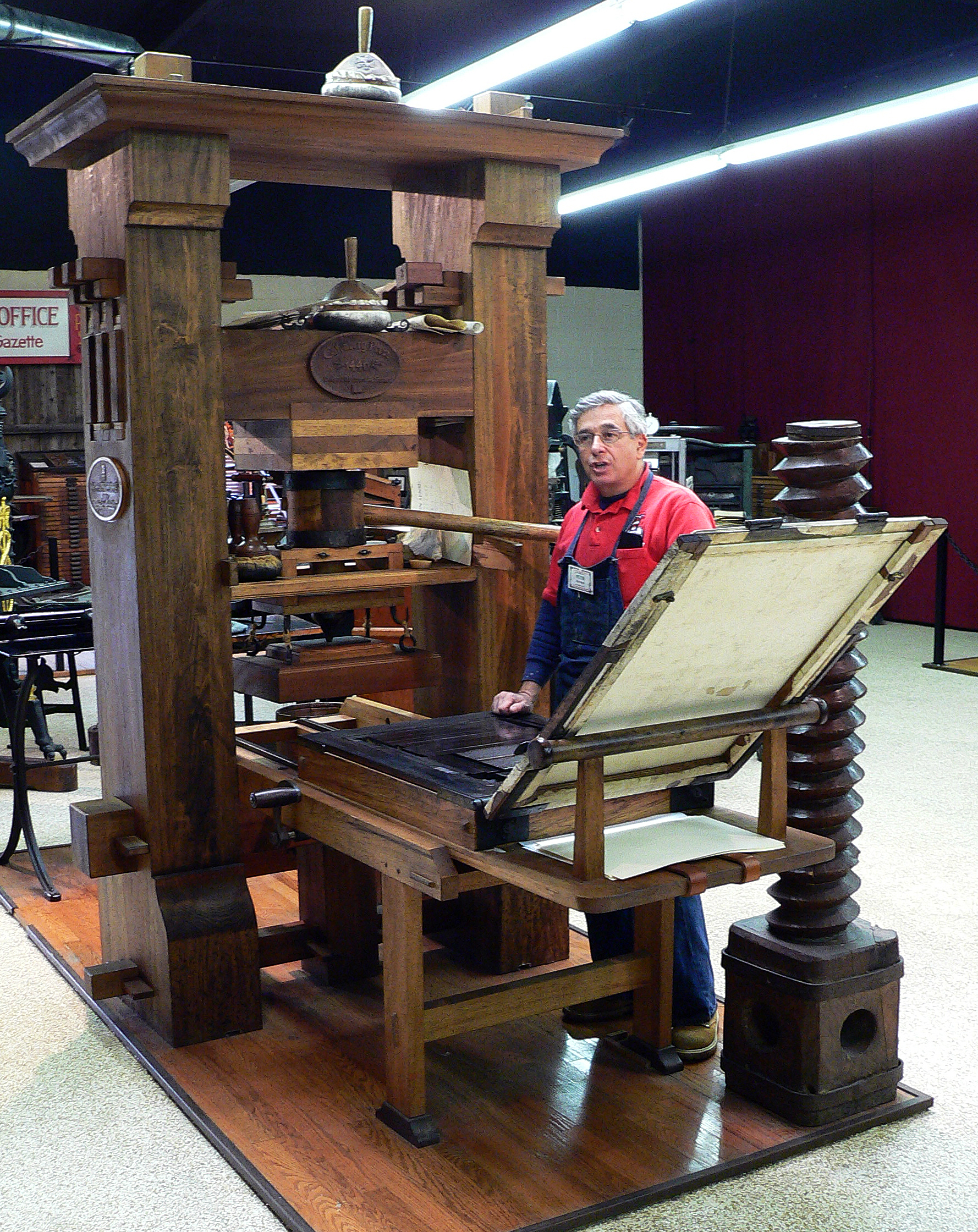
A printing press can be used for the printing of creative works for publication.

To publish is to make content available to the general public. While specific use of the term may vary among countries, it is usually applied to text, images, or other audio-visual content, including paper (newspapers, magazines, catalogs, etc.). Publication means the act of publishing, and also any copies issued for public distribution.

== Legal definition and copyright ==
Publication is a technical term in legal contexts and especially important in copyright legislation. An author of a work generally is the initial owner of the copyright on the work. One of the copyrights granted to the author of a work is the exclusive right to publish the work.

=== Indonesia ===
In Indonesia, publication is defined as:

“any reading, broadcasting, exhibition of works using any means, either electronically or nonelectronically, or performing in any way so that works can be read, heard, or seen by others.”

— Article 1, Law of the Republic of Indonesia Number 28 of 2014

=== United States ===
In the United States, publication is defined as:

the distribution of copies or phonorecords of a work to the public by sale or other transfer of ownership, or by rental, lease, or lending. The offering to distribute copies or phonorecords to a group of people for purposes of further distribution, public performance, or public display, constitutes publication. A public performance or display of a work does not of itself constitute publication.

To perform or display a work "publicly" means

to perform or display it at a place open to the public or at any place where a substantial number of people outside a normal circle of a family and its social acquaintances is gathered; or to transmit or otherwise communicate a performance or display of the work to a place specified by clause (1) or to the public, by means of any device or process, whether the members of the public capable of receiving the performance or display receive it in the same place or in separate places and at the same time or at different times.

— 17 USC 101

The US Copyright Office provides further guidance in Circular 40, which states:

When the work is reproduced in multiple copies, such as in reproductions of a painting or castings of a statue, the work is published when the reproductions are publicly distributed or offered to a group for further distribution or public display.

Generally, the right to publish a work is an exclusive right of copyright owner (17 USC 106), and violating this right (e.g. by disseminating copies of the work without the copyright owner's consent) is a copyright infringement (17 USC 501(a)), and the copyright owner can demand (by suing in court) that e.g. copies distributed against their will be confiscated and destroyed (17 USC 502, 17 USC 503). Exceptions and limitations are written into copyright law, however; for example, the exclusive rights of the copyright owner eventually expire, and even when in force, they do not extend to publications covered by fair use or certain types of uses by libraries and educational institutions.

The definition of "publication" as "distribution of copies to the general public with the consent of the author" is also supported by the Berne Convention, which makes mention of "copies" in article 3(3), where "published works" are defined. In the Universal Copyright Convention, "publication" is defined in article VI as "the reproduction in tangible form and the general distribution to the public of copies of a work from which it can be read or otherwise visually perceived." Many countries around the world follow this definition, although some make some exceptions for particular kinds of works. In Germany, §6 of the Urheberrechtsgesetz additionally considers works of the visual arts (such as sculptures) "published" if they have been made permanently accessible by the general public (i.e., erecting a sculpture on public grounds is publication in Germany). Australia and the UK (as the U.S.) do not have this exception and generally require the distribution of copies necessary for publication. In the case of sculptures, the copies must be even three-dimensional.

== Biological classification ==
In biological classification (taxonomy), the publication of the description of a taxon has to comply with some rules. The definition of the "publication" is defined in nomenclature codes. Traditionally there were the following rules:

- The publication must be generally available.
- The date of publication is the date the published material became generally available.

Electronic publication with some restrictions is permitted for publication of scientific names of fungi since 1 January 2013.

== Types ==
=== Material types ===
There are many material types of publication, some of which are:

- Book or codex: a medium for recording information in the form of writing or images, typically composed of many pages bound together and protected by a cover.
- Booklet: a leaflet of more than one sheet of paper, usually attached in the style of a book.
- Broadside: a large single sheet of paper printed on one side, designed to be plastered onto walls, produced from the 16th to 19th centuries, obsolete with the development of newspapers and cheap novels.
- Flyer or handbill: a small sheet of paper printed on one side, designed to be handed out free.
- Leaflet: a single sheet of paper printed on both sides and folded.
- Pamphlet: an unbound book.

==== Electronic publishing ====
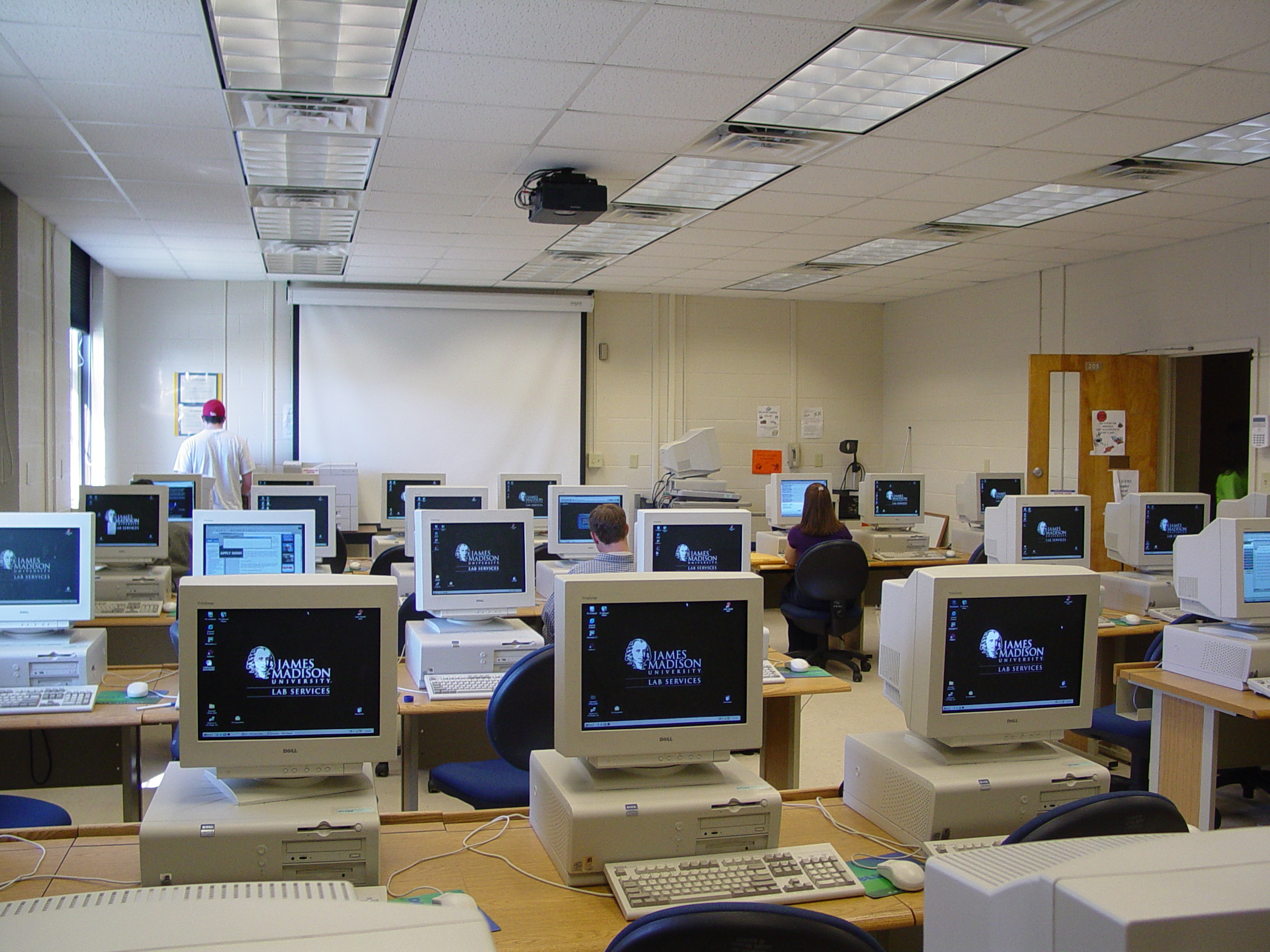
Modern computing and networking have revolutionized publishing.

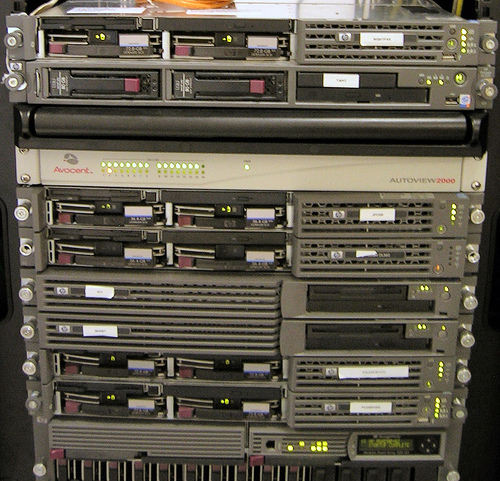
A server rack delivers data to online inquiries.

Electronic publishing (also referred to as e-publishing or digital publishing) includes the digital publication of websites, webpages, e-books, digital editions of periodical publications, and the development of digital libraries. It is now common to distribute books, magazines, and newspapers to consumers online. Publications may also be published on electronic media such as CD-ROMs.

=== Content types ===
Types of publication can also be distinguished by content, for example:

- Brochure: an informative document made for advertising products or services, usually in the form of a pamphlet or leaflet.
- Bulletin: information written in short on a flyer or inside another publication for public viewing, or a brief message or announcement broadcast to a wide audience by way of television, radio, or internet.
- Journal: a periodical publication in which scholarship relating to a particular academic discipline is published.
- Magazine: a periodical publication, generally published on a regular schedule (often weekly or monthly), containing a variety of content.
- Monograph: a long research publication written by one person.
- Newsletter: a bulletin, leaflet, pamphlet, or newspaper distributed to a specific audience.
- Newspaper: a periodical publication of several pages printed with news, sports, information, and advertising, and which may be published and distributed daily, weekly, monthly, quarterly, or annually.
- Tract: a religious or political argument written by one person and designed to be distributed free, usually in the form of a booklet or pamphlet, but sometimes longer.

=== Type standards ===
ISO 690, a set of guidelines for bibliographic references and citations to information resources, defines a publication as a "message or document offered for general distribution or sale and usually produced in multiple copies", and lists types of publications including monographs and their components and serials and their components. Common bibliographic software specifications such as BibTeX and Citation Style Language also list types of publications, as do various standards for library cataloging. For example, RDA, a cataloging standard adopted by the Library of Congress in 2013 and by some other national libraries, differentiates between content types, media types, and carrier types of information resources.

== Unpublished works ==
A work that has not undergone publication, and thus is not generally available to the public, or for citation in scholarly or legal contexts, is called an unpublished work. In some cases unpublished works are widely cited, or circulated via informal means. An author who has not yet published a work may also be referred to as being unpublished.

The status of being unpublished has specific significance in the legal context, where it may refer to the non-publication of legal opinions in the United States.
