= Controversial literature (Library of Congress Subject Headings) =

Controversial literature is a subdivision of the Library of Congress Subject Headings, used in the description of religious books. In this context, it has the following narrow use: "under names of individual religious and monastic orders, individual religions, individual Christian denominations, and uniform titles of sacred works for works that argue against or express opposition to those groups or works". Prior to 1998 the subdivision was permitted for 'general religious and philosophical topics'.

== See also ==
- Library of Congress Classification
