= GMD =

GMD may refer to:

- Ben Slimane Airport, in Morocco
- Gambian dalasi, the currency of Gambia by ISO 4217 code
- Game (British retailer), a British video game retailer
- GDP-mannose 4,6-dehydratase, in enzymology
- General material designation, in library cataloguing
- General Motors Diesel, a Canadian diesel locomotive manufacturer
- Generalmusikdirektor (general music director) for an orchestra, town etc.
- Generation for Modernity and Development, political coalition in Guinea
- Geoscientific Model Development, a journal
- Geometry Dash, a side-scrolling music platforming video game for mobile devices and computers
- Gesellschaft für Mathematik und Datenverarbeitung (Society for Mathematics and Information technology), now a part of the Fraunhofer Society
- Gibraltar Medallion of Distinction
- The Glam Metal Detectives, a British comedy series
- Goldstein Museum of Design of the University of Minnesota
- Golm Metabolome Database, in chemical processes
- Grimsby Docks railway station, in England
- Ground-Based Midcourse Defense, part of the United States missile defense system
- Kuomintang, a major Taiwanese political party (based on alternative pinyin romanization of "Guomindang")
- Maghdi language, spoken in Nigeria
