= Preußische Instruktionen =

Cataloguing set of rules in German-speaking countries

The Preußische Instruktionen (abbreviated PI, German for 'Prussian Instructions') were a set of cataloging rules used in scientific libraries in German-speaking countries and, to some extent, abroad. First published in 1899, the PI were replaced by other sets of rules such as the Regeln für die alphabetische Katalogisierung (RAK) from the 1980s onwards, which in turn have been replaced by the Resource Description and Access (RDA) rules since 2015.

== History ==
Already in 1874 (hectographed edition) and 1886 (printed edition), Karl Franz Otto Dziatzko of the University Library at Breslau had presented a set of cataloging rules under the title "Instruction für die Ordnung der Titel im Alphabetischen Zettelkatalog der Königlichen und Universitäts-Bibliothek zu Breslau", also known as "Breslauer Instructionen" (English: Breslau instructions). In there, the order of the titles was defined, but not the bibliographic recording.

In 1890, the Königliche Bibliothek in Berlin created "instructions" that regulated the admission but not the order of entries.

In 1899, a compromise arose from these two sets of instructions, resulting in the first uniform set of rules, the "Preußische Instruktionen" (PI). They were first published on 10 May 1899 under the title "Instruktionen für die alphabetischen Kataloge der preussischen Bibliotheken und für den preussischen Gesamtkatalog". Fritz Milkau, a later employee of Friedrich Althoff, played a decisive role in the creation of the PI. The second edition appeared in 1908. The PI formed the basis for the Preußischer Gesamtkatalog, the later Deutscher Gesamtkatalog (English: German General Catalog).

During their time, the PI were a major step forward in the German library landscape and they were occasionally adopted also outside of Prussia. Despite their role model, it was often not possible to achieve a uniform and fully consistent application of the guidelines in the cataloging of some important libraries in Bavaria, Hesse, Saxony and at other traditional German library locations before the introduction of digital computers. In the international network of libraries, those rules which were tied to the structure of the German language and therefore difficult to transfer into other languages, have been replaced by other sets of rules.

One of the peculiarities of the PI is that multi-author writings (with four or more authors) and factual title writings were sorted according to the principle of grammatical order. This means that typically the first independent noun is relevant for the classification in the (card) catalog. Articles and prepositions are ignored. In addition, there are no entries in the PI under corporate bodies. Titles are arranged grammatically not mechanically, and literature is entered under its title. There is no difference between the letters "I" and "J" to be made, and German umlauts are sorted alongside their non-diacritical letters. Scientific transliteration of Cyrillic into Latin was first introduced in 1898 as part of the standardization process for the PI. The publications of an author are divided into groups: first, editions of works are listed, then partial collections, fragments and excerpts from works, only then followed by individual writings.

The application of the rules is comparatively complex and unsuitable for online catalogs such as Online Public Access Catalogue (OPAC), consequently they are rarely used today. In the case of library catalogs following keywords or correspondingly structured directories, knowledge of these rules is still helpful, however. Also, historical holdings still exist in libraries which are organized in catalogs based on the PI system.

== See also ==
- DIN 1505
- Paris Principles (PP)
- Berliner Anweisungen (BA)
- Gesamtkatalog der Wiegendrucke
