= Alternative title =

New title for a work that differs from the original published title

An alternative title is a media sales device most prominently used in film distribution. Books and films are commonly released under a different title when they are screened or sold in a different country. This can vary from small change to the title, such as the addition of The, to wholesale changes. Film titles are also often changed when they are released on DVD or VHS.

The reasons for this are varied, but usually point towards marketable, linguistic or cultural differences. Some titles may not be easily understood in other parts of the world, and may even be considered offensive. Most title changes are commercial. An example is Italian director's Sergio Leone's 1971 film Duck, You Sucker!, initially released with this title as he was convinced it was a well-known English saying. When the film performed poorly, it was subsequently rebranded as A Fistful of Dynamite, similar in name to his 1964 film A Fistful of Dollars, part of the successful Dollars Trilogy.

In the music industry, many songwriters use the hook of a song as its alternative title.
