= Online catalog =

An online catalog or online catalogue might refer to:

- The retail product offerings of an online shopping service
- An electronic library catalog
