= General material designation =

General Material Designation (GMD) is a phrase or term interposed in brackets following the title of a catalogue or archive record to denote an item's material type. The usage of GMD in cataloging and classifying records was encouraged by the recording standard Anglo-American Cataloging Rules (AACR2). It has been included in the International Standard Bibliographic Description as part of the ongoing process to standardize international and local cataloging standards.

== Usage ==
General Material Designation creates a list of standardized terms, describing the material of the item. Examples of GMD terms commonly used in institutional cataloguing to identify material types include: cartographic material, electronic resource, game, graphic, kit, manuscript, microform, motion picture, music, realia, sound recording, and video recording. Other GMD terms, such as braille, microfilm, and motion picture are used to eliminate different cataloging practices which were previously used by libraries. The full list appears in AACR2, with explanations and examples.

Per machine-readable cataloging (MARC) standards, a General Material Designation term or phrase can be applied at different points in the catalog. Points of access include title, alternative titles, author and subject.

Despite being superseded by the Resource Description and Access (RDA) rules, the GMD is still used in many institutions.

== Issues ==
In recent years, a number of issues regarding GMD have arisen, including lack of terms to define new material types, lack of consistency in application by different library systems, incompatibility with needs of special libraries and museums, and the difficulty of relating to digital forms. In 2013, GMD was superseded by RDA, which greatly enlarged the list and divided the list into three, describing content, media and carrier types.
