= International Cataloguing Principles =

The (Statement of) International Cataloguing Principles (ICP) define(s) the foundation for the creation of bibliographical cataloging rules for libraries. The ICPs are an initiative of the International Federation of Library Associations and Institutions (IFLA) to modernize and replace the old Paris Principles (PP).

The ICPs were drawn up at conferences, the IFLA Meetings of Experts on an International Cataloguing Code (IME-ICC), on four different continents: in Frankfurt am Main (2003), Buenos Aires (2004), Cairo (2005), Seoul (2006) and Pretoria (2007). First published in 2009, they were revised again in 2014 and 2015. A new ICP edition was published in 2016.

The ICPs are intended as a global guideline for the development of cataloging regulations. They aim to achieve uniformity in both formal and subject indexing and have been created for all types of media (not just books).

The ICPs build on Functional Requirements for Bibliographic Records (FRBRs) and other catalog traditions and, together with the FRBRs, form the basis for the Resource Description and Access (RDA) standard.

== See also ==
- Breslauer Instructionen
- Preußische Instruktionen (PI)
- Berliner Anweisungen (BA)
- Online Public Access Catalogue (OPAC)
- MARC standards
- Resource Description and Access
- Library of Congress Classification
