= Working title =

Preliminary title of a creative work

A working title is a preliminary name for a product or project. The usage is especially common in film and TV, gaming, music and publishing. It is often styled in trade publications as (wt) and is synonymous with production title and tentative title.

== Usage ==
Working titles are commonly used in film and TV, gaming, music, and publishing. They are used mainly because an official title has not yet been decided upon or to intentionally disguise the real nature of a project.

It is often styled in trade publications as (wt).

=== Usage as production titles ===
The terms "production title" and "tentative title" are sometimes used instead of "working title". Working titles are primarily a practical matter, just to prevent confusion as ideas for release titles can keep on changing for a variety of reasons. For example, while James Bond films are commonly produced under numerical titles such as Bond 22 until the official title is announced as part of its marketing, release titles may also change because of significant changes to the plot during production, as happened with Disney's The Emperor's New Groove, whose working title was Kingdom of the Sun.

In some cases a working title may ultimately be used as the release title, as in the case of leading man Samuel L. Jackson insisting on the title Snakes on a Plane, after he learned the title was going to be changed to Pacific Air Flight 121 upon release.

=== Usage as a ruse title ===
Fake production titles are frequently used by high-profile films or television series to prevent undesired attention by the press or fandom, price gouging by suppliers and casual or targeted theft. Notable examples of ruse titles include Blue Harvest (Return of the Jedi), Incident of 57th Street (Harry Potter and the Chamber of Secrets), Red Gun (House of the Dragon), and the Batman films Batman Begins, The Dark Knight and The Dark Knight Rises, which were produced under the titles The Intimidation Game, Rory's First Kiss and Magnus Rex.
