= Karl Franz Otto Dziatzko =

German librarian and scholar (1842–1903)

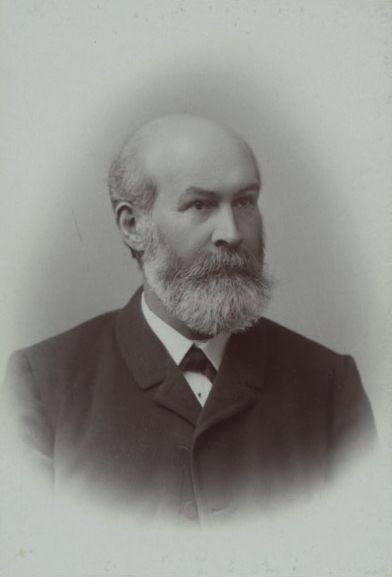
- Born: January 27, 1842; Neustadt, Silesia, Kingdom of Prussia
- Died: January 13, 1903 (aged 60)
- Occupations: librarian, scholar

Karl Franz Otto Dziatzko (27 January 1842 - 13 January 1903, Göttingen) was a German librarian and scholar, born in Neustadt, Silesia.

== Biography ==
From 1859 to 1863 he studied classical philology at the universities of Breslau and Bonn. At Bonn, he was influenced by philologist Friedrich Wilhelm Ritschl and worked as an assistant at the university library. In 1863, he received his doctorate with a thesis on the prologues of Plautus and Terence. Following graduation, he worked as a schoolteacher in Opole and then in Lucerne (from 1865).

In 1871, he became head librarian at the University of Freiburg, where he also obtained his habilitation the same year. After a brief stint as a schoolteacher in Karlsruhe, he was appointed director of the university library at Breslau (1872). Here, he headed a comprehensive reorganization of the library that included rules for a new alphabetical card catalog that became a model for the Preußische Instruktionen. From 1886 until his death, he was director of the university library and professor of library science at the University of Göttingen.

With educator Friedrich Althoff, he strove for reforms pertaining to academic librarianship during the latter part of the 19th century. At Göttingen, he was instrumental in the creation of a professional librarian association (initially a section within the Philologenverbande (Philology Association). Also, he made significant contributions in the fields of "Gutenberg research" and incunabula studies, that included a complete incunabula catalog

Among his publications are a text edition of the comedies of Terence (1884); "Instruction für die Ordnung der Titel im Alphabetischen Zettelkatalog der Königlichen und Universitäts-Bibliothek zu Breslau" (hectographed in 1874, printed in 1886); and "Untersuchungen über ausgewählte Kapitel des antiken Buchwesens" (1900). The publication of 1886 is said to be the basis of K. A. Linderfelt's "Eclectic Card Catalog Rules" (Boston, 1890).

== Bibliography ==
- De prologis Plautinis et Terentianis quaestiones selectae (dissertation) Bonn 1863.
- Ausgewählte Komödien des P. Terentius Afer : zur Einführung in die Lektüre der altlateinischen Lustspiele. Teubner, Leipzig 1874ff. (viele Neuauflagen) – Selected comedies of P. Terentius Afer: Introduction to the reading of Old Latin comedies.
- P. Terenti Afri Comoediae. Tauchnitz. second edition, Leipzig 1884.
- Instruction für die Ordnung der Titel im Alphabetischen Zettelkatalog der Königlichen und Universitäts-Bibliothek zu Breslau. Asher, Berlin 1886 – Instruction for the order of titles in the alphabetical card catalog of the Royal Library and the University of Breslau.
- Beiträge zur Gutenbergfrage. Asher, Berlin 1889 – Contributions to the Gutenberg question.
- Gutenbergs früheste Druckerpraxis. Asher, Berlin 1890.– Gutenberg's earliest printing practice.
- Entwickelung und gegenwärtiger Stand der wissenschaftlichen Bibliotheken Deutschlands mit besonderer Berücksichtigung Preußens. Spirgatis, Leipzig 1893 – Development and current state of academic libraries: with special consideration to Prussia.
- Untersuchungen über ausgewählte Kapitel des antiken Buchwesens. Teubner, Leipzig 1900 – Studies on selected chapters of the ancient bibliology.
- Das neue Fragment der Περικειρομένη [Perikeiromene] des Menander. Leipzig: Teubner, 1900 (=Sonderdruck aus dem XXVII. Supplementband der Jahrbücher für classische Philologie, Festschrift C. F. W. Müller, S. 123–134) – A new fragment of Perikeiromene by Menander.
