= International Standard Bibliographic Description =

Standard for description of bibliographic resources

The International Standard Bibliographic Description (ISBD) is a set of rules produced by the International Federation of Library Associations and Institutions (IFLA) to create a bibliographic description in a standard, human-readable form, especially for use in a bibliography or a library catalog. A preliminary consolidated edition of the ISBD was published in 2007 and the consolidated edition was published in 2011, superseding earlier separate ISBDs for monographs, older monographic publications, cartographic materials, serials and other continuing resources, electronic resources, non-book materials, and printed music. In 2022, IFLA published the 2021 update to the 2011 consolidated edition, which includes expanding ISBD to include unpublished resources, integrating stipulations for the application of ISBD to the description of component parts, clarifying cartographic resources stipulations, as well as added examples and updates to the Areas and glossary sections. IFLA's ISBD Review Group is responsible for maintaining the ISBD.

One of the original purposes of the ISBD was to provide a standard form of bibliographic description that could be used to exchange records internationally. This would support IFLA's Universal Bibliographic Control program.

== Structure of an ISBD record ==
The ISBD defines nine areas of description. Each area, except area 7, is composed of multiple elements with structured classifications. Elements and areas that do not apply to a particular resource are omitted from the description. Standardized punctuation (colons, semicolons, slashes, dashes, commas, and periods) is used to identify and separate the elements and areas. The order of elements and standardized punctuation make it easier to interpret bibliographic records when one does not understand the language of the description.

- 0: Content form and media type area
- 1: Title and statement of responsibility area, consisting of
  - 1.1 Title proper
  - 1.2 Parallel title
  - 1.3 Other title information
  - 1.4 Statement of responsibility
- 2: Edition area
- 3: Material or type of resource specific area (e.g., the scale of a map or the numbering of a periodical)
- 4: Publication, production, distribution, etc., area
- 5: Material description area (e.g., number of pages in a book or number of CDs issued as a unit)
- 6: Series area
- 7: Notes area
- 8: Resource identifier and terms of availability area (e.g., ISBN, ISSN)

== Example ==
A typical ISBD record looks like this:

Text : unmediated
A manual for writers of research papers, theses, and dissertations : Chicago style for students and researchers / Kate L. Turabian; revised by Wayne C. Booth, Gregory G. Colomb, Joseph M. Williams, and University of Chicago Press editorial staff. — 7th edition. — Chicago : University of Chicago Press, 2007. — xviii, 466 pages : illustrations; 23 cm. — (Chicago guides to writing, editing, and publishing). — Includes bibliographical references (pages 409-435) and index. — ISBN 978-0-226-82336-2 (cloth : alk. paper) : USD35.00. — ISBN 978-0-226-82337-9 (pbk. : alk. paper) : USD17.00

== See also ==
- Anglo-American Cataloguing Rules (AACR)
- BIBFRAME
- Bibliographic control
- ISO 690
- Library catalog
- MARC standards
- Paris Principles (PP)
- Resource Description and Access (RDA)
- Supply chain management
