= Seymour Lubetzky =

American librarian (1898–2003)

- Сеймур Любецкі
- Born: Shmaryahu Lubetzky; April 28, 1898; Zelva, Russian Empire (now Belarus)
- Died: April 5, 2003 (aged 104); Los Angeles, California, U.S.
- Education: UCLA and UC Berkeley
- Scientific career
- Fields: Library science
- Workplaces: Library of Congress

Seymour Lubetzky (Note: Belarusian: Сеймур Любецкі, romanized: Syeymur Lyubyetski) (April 28, 1898 – April 5, 2003, born Shmaryahu Lubetzky) (Note: Belarusian: Шмар'ягу Любецкі, romanized: Shmar"yahu Lyubyetski) was a major cataloging theorist and a prominent librarian.

== Early life and education ==
Born in village of Zelwa, in the Russian Empire in what is now modern-day Belarus, Lubetzky worked as a teacher before he immigrated to the United States in 1927. He earned his BA from UCLA in 1931, and his MA from UC Berkeley in 1932.

== Career ==
In 1936, Lubetzky began to work as a cataloger at UCLA. He started working at the Library of Congress in 1943 where he was employed for 17 years.

In 1960, Lubetzky began teaching at the UCLA Graduate School of Education and Information Studies, then the School of Library Service. He retired from UCLA in 1969, but continued to teach part-time for many years.

He was fluent in six languages, a fact that made him valuable both as a cataloger and a speaker at library conferences.

== Influence on cataloging ==
Lubetzky published three books that influenced the discipline of cataloging, and that are still influential in area of information technology. Librarianship in particular and information science in general had not been revolutionized as much since the likes of Antonio Panizzi, Charles Ammi Cutter or Paul Otlet. Cataloging Rules and Principles and Principles of Cataloging, as well as several periodical articles, solidified Lubetzky as one of the most significant influences in his field. He developed a rationalized approach to catalog code design, one that is even more relevant today as current cataloging principles are revisited and revised for a digital environment.

His unfinished book, Code of Cataloging Rules... unfinished draft (1960), was the basis for modern cataloging adopted by the first International Conference on Cataloguing Principles (CCP) (1961) held in Paris, France, called the "Paris Principles" (PP). The code which eventually emerged from the conference became the basis for cataloging practice in the 20th century. In 1967 these concepts were encoded in the Anglo-American Cataloging Rules, which were used in US, Canadian and UK libraries.

Lubetzky is credited with renewing an emphasis on the "work" in library catalogs. This had been a feature of book catalogs of the early 19th century, but was not carried through to the card catalog. Whereas Charles Ammi Cutter, a late 19th century influence on cataloging, had not distinguished between the idea of a "book" and the idea of the "work" in formulating his objectives, Lubetzky contrasts the two ideas, bringing back into play Anthony Panizzi's original emphasis on the relationship between a title and all of the different editions of that title that might exist. Lubetzky's idea was that relationships among all the editions and variations of a given work and the author of that work, in all variations of the author's name, must be established and brought together so they can be found in one place. All the works of a given author, in all their editions, should be linked together. As Lubetzky said at a 1977 Los Angeles conference, "The Catalog in the Age of Technological Change":

The catalogue has to tell you more than what you ask for…. The answer of a good catalogue is not to say yes or no, but … to tell [the user] that the library has [the item] in so many editions and translations, and you have your choice.

== Legacy ==
Two books are dedicated to the work of Lubetzky, one entitled Seymour Lubetzky: Writings on the Classical Art of Cataloging and Future of Cataloging: The Lubetzky Symposium.

In 1997 he was awarded the Melvil Dewey Medal by the American Library Association.

Just before his 104th birthday, the American Library Association awarded Lubetzky its highest honor, American Library Association Honorary Membership.

== Personal life and death ==
Lubetzky was married to Beatrice Charnas Lubetzky for 47 years, and together they had two sons. She died in 1981.

Lubetzky died in Los Angeles on April 5, 2003 at the age of 104.

== Bibliography ==
- Lubetzky, Seymour. Cataloging Rules and Principles: A Critique of the A.L.A. Rules for Entry and a Proposed Design for Their Revision; Prepared for the Board on Cataloguing Policy and Research of the A.L.A. Division of Cataloging and Classification. High Wycombe St. John's Rd, Tylers Green, Penn, High Wycombe, Bucks.: University Microfilms Ltd for the College of Librarianship, Wales, 1970.
- Lubetzky, Seymour. Principles of Cataloging: Final Report. Los Angeles: Institute of Library Research, University of California, 1969.
- Lubetzky, Seymour. The Author and Title Catalog in the Library; Its Role, Function, and Objectives; Report 2 of a Series on the Principles of Cataloging. (1969).
- Lubetzky, Seymour. Code of Cataloging Rules: Author and Title Entry. an Unfinished Draft for a New Edition of Cataloging Rules. Chicago: American Library Assn, 1960.
- List of famous librarians
