= Uniform title =

Clarifying title in library cataloging

A uniform title in library cataloging is a distinctive title assigned to a work which either has no title or has appeared under more than one title. Establishing a uniform title is an aspect of authority control. The phrases conventional title and standard title are sometimes used; Resource Description and Access uses preferred title; while the 2009 Statement of International Cataloguing Principles deprecates "uniform title" in favour of authorized access point.

There are many instances in which a uniform title can be used. Anonymous works such as sacred texts and folk tales may lack an obvious title: for instance, the Bible, Epic of Gilgamesh, Beowulf, or the Chanson de Roland. Works of art and music may contain no text that can be used for reference. A uniform title allows all versions of the work to collate under one title and will reference all of the items to which the uniform title applies.

For example, if a library has 10 copies of Crime and Punishment, each in a different language, an online library catalogue can display all of the copies of the book together under the chosen uniform title. The library could also list any copies of Crime and Punishment in other media, such as film adaptations or abridged editions, under the same uniform title. This can help a library patron when searching the online catalog find all of the versions of Crime and Punishment at once instead of searching for each foreign title or film individually.

Uniform titles are particularly useful when cataloguing music, where pieces of music are often known by multiple valid titles and those titles are known in multiple languages, or when an individual work has been adapted as a contrafactum.

The Library of Congress provides an example of how books of the New Testament are referred to in the Anglo-American Cataloging Rules:

- Bible. N.T. Acts
- Bible. N.T. Colossians
- Bible. N.T. Corinthians, 1st
- Bible. N.T. Corinthians, 2nd
- Bible. N.T. Ephesians ...

Example:

- edition being cataloged: Othello / William Shakespeare
- established uniform title: Shakespeare, William ... Othello
- no uniform title assigned to the edition being cataloged

Example:

- edition being cataloged: The tempest / William Shakespeare
- established uniform title: Shakespeare, William ... Tempest

The complementary situation occurs with a single work that exists with more than one title, especially when translated into another language, excerpted or collected with other works. In this case, the name of the language or a phrase such as 'Selections' is added to distinguish works with the same uniform title.

The MARC 21 standard uses fields 240, 243, 630, 730 and 830 for uniform titles.
