= Gibraltar Medallion of Distinction =

- Location: Gibraltar City Hall
- Country: Gibraltar
- Presented by: Mayor of Gibraltar
- First award: 2011

The Gibraltar Medallion of Distinction (GMD) is a civil award scheme established by the Parliament of the British overseas territory of Gibraltar.

== Award ==
The Gibraltar Medallion of Distinction was created by a motion of the Gibraltar Parliament on the 29 July 2011 and is awarded annually by the Parliament to "living or deceased persons who have attained distinction in any event, activity, aspect of life or subject matter and have thereby made an exceptional contribution to the community which Parliament considers worthy of special recognition". The award entitles the recipient to use the post-nominal letters GMD.
