= Anglo-American Cataloguing Rules =

Library cataloging standard

Anglo-American Cataloguing Rules (AACR) were an international library cataloging standard. First published in 1967 and edited by C. Sumner Spalding, a second edition (AACR2) edited by Michael Gorman and Paul W. Winkler was issued in 1978, with subsequent revisions (AACR2R) appearing in 1988 and 1998; all updates ceased in 2005.

Published jointly by the American Library Association, the Canadian Library Association, and the UK Chartered Institute of Library and Information Professionals, the rules were designed for the construction of library catalogs and similar bibliographic tools. The rules cover the physical description of library resources, as well as the provision of name and title access points.

AACR2 was issued in several print versions, including a concise edition and an online version. Various translations were also available. Principles of AACR included cataloguing based on the item "in hand" rather than inferring information from external sources and the concept of the "chief source of information" which is preferred where conflicts exist.

== Initial adoption ==
Despite the claim to be "Anglo-American", the North American and British first editions of AACR in 1967 differed in content. The second edition of 1978 unified the two sets of rules, adopting the British spelling "cataloguing", and brought them in line with the International Standard Bibliographic Description (ISBD). Libraries wishing to migrate from the previous North American text were obliged to implement "desuperimposition", a substantial change in the form of headings for corporate bodies.

== Successor ==
While the 2002 updates included substantial improvements to AACR's treatment of non-book materials, the proliferation of 21st century formats in a networked environment and the rise of electronic publishing signaled the necessity for significant change in the cataloging code. Plans for a third edition (AACR3) were abandoned in 2005.

The international cataloging community turned its attention to drafting a completely new standard to succeed AACR. Informed by the work of the International Federation of Library Associations and Institutions (IFLA) Functional Requirements for Bibliographic Records (FRBR), the new framework was crafted to be more flexible and suitable for use in a digital environment: Resource Description and Access (RDA) was released in June 2010. The Library of Congress, National Library of Medicine, National Agricultural Library, and several national libraries of other English-speaking countries performed a formal test of RDA, resulting in a June 2011 report of findings.

The physical description recorded in MARC field 300 illustrates some of the differences in cataloging practice between AACR2 and RDA. For example, many abbreviations, such as "p." for "pages," under AACR2 are spelled out under RDA. AACR2's General Material Designation (GMD), recorded in subfield h in MARC field 245, was superseded under RDA rules by content, media, and carrier types, recorded in MARC fields 336, 337, and 338. However, some libraries retained GMDs after adopting RDA.

== See also ==
- MARC standards
- Resource Description and Access
- Library of Congress Classification
- Statement of International Cataloguing Principles
- Regeln für die alphabetische Katalogisierung (RAK)
