= Regeln für die alphabetische Katalogisierung =

Cataloguing rules in German-speaking countries

The Regeln für die alphabetische Katalogisierung or RAK (also known as Regeln der alphabetischen Katalogisierung, translating as: Rules for alphabetical cataloging) are a bibliographic cataloging set of rules. The RAK rules appeared for the first time in 1976 and became the dominant set of rules in Germany and Austria in the 1980s.

The theoretical model on which the RAK rules were based on are the "Paris Principles" (PP), drawn up in 1961 at a conference of the International Federation of Library Associations and Institutions (IFLA). The International Standard Bibliographic Description (ISBD), which has existed since 1971, formed the further basis for the RAK.

Like their counterpart from the English-speaking world, the Anglo-American Cataloging Rules (AACR), the RAK rules are very complex and, despite their suitability for creating electronic library catalogs, they are still strongly oriented towards card catalogs. Forms of headings in the original language of the medium to be cataloged and a priority of purely formal decision-making criteria, for example when a corporation is chosen as the main entry, are characteristic for RAK.

Since 2015, the RAK is being replaced by the international Resource Description and Access (RDA) set of rules.

== History ==
The first edition of the RAK appeared in 1976 in the German Democratic Republic (GDR/DDR) and a year later in the Federal Republic of Germany (FRG/BRD). They formed the long-awaited replacement of the outdated Preußische Instruktionen (PI) (English: Prussian instructions), introduced in 1899 and expanded by DIN 1505 in 1932.

The development of a fundamentally renewed revision called RAK2 was discontinued in the course of the discussion about switching to AACR2. The successor to AACR2 is the Resource Description and Access (RDA) set of rules.

== Family of rules ==
Originally there was only one uniform RAK edition with alternative regulations for different requirements or library types. Due to the different requirements, the alternative regulations were recorded in different sets of rules for scientific libraries (RAK-WB) and public libraries (RAK-ÖB), and further regulation works for special types of media were developed:

- The Regeln für die alphabetische Katalogisierung in wissenschaftlichen Bibliotheken (RAK-WB) (English: Rules for Alphabetical Cataloging in Scientific Libraries) apply to scientific libraries and were published in 1983. The second edition from 1994 was updated in 1995, 1996, 1998 and 2002 through add-on deliveries. The current version dates from 2006 and will no longer be updated in view of the imminent replacement of the RAK by RDA. From 1993, the RAK-WB appeared as loose-leaf edition.
- The Regeln für die alphabetische Katalogisierung in öffentlichen Bibliotheken (RAK-ÖB) (English: Rules for Alphabetical Cataloging in Public Libraries) are used in public libraries.
- Various special regulations have been drawn up for certain forms of media:
  - The Regeln für die alphabetische Katalogisierung von Ausgaben musikalischer Werke (RAK-Musik) (English: Rules for the alphabetical cataloging of editions of musical works) in a revised edition from 2003 apply to music (printed music, music sound carriers, etc.).
  - For media which are not books (images, sound media, microforms, etc.), the Regeln für die alphabetische Katalogisierung von Nichtbuchmaterialien (RAK-NBM) (English: Rules for the alphabetical cataloging of non-book materials) apply. The last update of the loose-leaf edition took place in 2006.
  - RAK-Karten (English: RAK maps), published in 1987, are used for cartographic materials (maps, aerial photographs, plans, etc.).

== DIN standards ==
The formal cataloging rules are specified in DIN 1505:

- DIN 1505-1: Titelangaben von Dokumenten: Titelaufnahme von Schrifttum (in German). Deutsches Institut für Normung. May 1984. — withdrawn in 2007 without replacement
- DIN 1505-2: Titelangaben von Dokumenten: Zitierregeln (in German). Deutsches Institut für Normung. January 1984. — replaced 2013 by ISO 690
- DIN 1505-3: Titelangaben von Dokumenten: Verzeichnisse zitierter Dokumente (Literaturverzeichnisse) (in German). Deutsches Institut für Normung. December 1995.
- DIN V 1505-4: Titelangaben von Dokumenten: Titelaufnahme von audio-visuellen Materialien (Vornorm) (in German). Deutsches Institut für Normung. June 1998. — withdrawn without replacement
