= Friedrich Althoff =

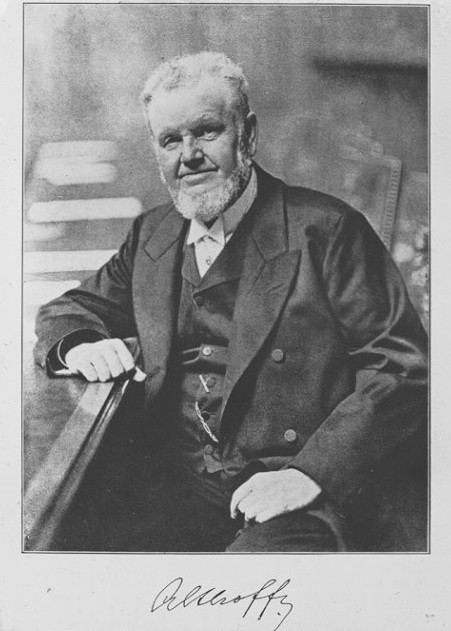
Friedrich Althoff

Friedrich Theodor Althoff (19 February 1839 – 20 October 1908), was head of the university department in the Prussian Ministry of Education, and played a leading role in developing the research university in Prussia. This system became the model for research universities in the United States and much of Europe.

He was a graduate of Bonn University in 1861, but never took a doctorate. When Germany took over Alsace-Lorraine in 1871, he became a legal advisor to the civil commissioners office. In 1882-1907, he served as privy councillor and chief executive officer of the Prussian Ministry of Ecclesiastical, Educational, and Medical Affairs. This put them in charge of higher education in Prussia, and the most important educational official in Germany. He achieved heavy funding and strong support from the Prussian government under Otto von Bismarck, and was in close contact with the Kaiser and with private financiers eager to help their alma mater. He strove to turn the undergraduate-oriented Prussian schools into preeminent research centers in the humanities, law, theology, sciences, and medicine. His model was soon used by new American universities including Clark University, Johns Hopkins University, and the University of Chicago to concentrate on advanced research. He mastered bureaucratic politics and was the virtual dictator of Prussian higher education, but was not a power in the other German states. He helped all the Prussian universities, but his favorites were the Humboldt University of Berlin and the University of Tübingen. In the final decision-making in hiring key people, and he disregarded local prejudices in often selecting Jews, Catholics and secular scholars. He led the German delegation to the world's fairs in Chicago in 1893 in St. Louis in 1904, and created exchange professorships with American universities.
