= Universal Bibliographic Control =

Library cataloging and classification concept

Universal Bibliographic Control (UBC) was a concept championed by the International Federation of Library Associations and Institutions (IFLA). Under the theoretical UBC, any document would only be cataloged once in its country of origin, and that record would then be available for the use of any library in the world. Current UBC practice is developed by IFLA's Bibliography Section.

During the 1970s, IFLA established an office for Universal Bibliographic Control.

Dunsire, Hillman, Phipps, and Willer have suggested that Semantic Web technologies, including BIBFRAME may allow UBC.

== See also ==
- UNIMARC – Digital formats for library cataloguing
- Union catalog – Combined library catalog describing the collections of a number of libraries
- Universal Decimal Classification – Bibliographic and library classification system
- Virtual International Authority File – International authority file
- WorldCat – International union library catalog
