= Paris Principles (cataloging) =

Principles of bibliographical cataloging rules

The Paris Principles (PP), also known as the Statement of Principles, defined the theoretical foundation for the creation of bibliographical cataloging rules for libraries. They were specified and agreed upon in October 1961 at the Conference on Cataloguing Principles (CCP) of the International Federation of Library Associations and Institutions (IFLA) in Paris.

The six-page script stipulated which function and structure library catalogs should have in the future. It was the first international agreement – delegations from 65 countries were involved – on fundamental questions of cataloging, which formed an important basis for the development of regulations such as the German Regeln für die alphabetische Katalogisierung (RAK).

For example, determining the function of a library catalog is influential up to now. By using the catalog, the user should be able to determine whether a respective library holds a certain book of which is known:

- the author and the title, or
- only the title (if the author is not mentioned in the book), or
- a suitable replacement for the title (if the author and title are unsuitable or insufficient).

In addition, the catalog should allow to determine which works by a particular author and which specific editions of a work are present in a library.

Since 2009, the Paris Principles have been replaced by the International Cataloguing Principles (ICP), also an IFLA initiative.

== See also ==
- Breslauer Instructionen
- Preußische Instruktionen (PI)
- Berliner Anweisungen (BA)
- Online Public Access Catalogue (OPAC)
- Seymour Lubetzky
