= ISO 690 =

ISO standard for bibliographic referencing

ISO 690 is an ISO standard governing bibliographic references in different kinds of documents, including electronic documents. This international standard specifies the bibliographic elements that need to be included in references to published documents, and the order in which these elements should be stated.

== Characteristics ==
ISO 690 governs bibliographic references to published material in both print and non-print documents. The current version of the standard was published in 2021 and covers all kinds of information resources, including monographs, serials, contributions, patents, cartographic materials, electronic information resources (including computer software and databases), music, recorded sound, prints, photographs, graphic and audiovisual works, and moving images.

ISO 690 ranks among a number of ISO standards that bear on academic publishing, such as ISO 214, which establishes rules for abstracts; ISO 2145, which deals with numbering of divisions and subdivisions of written documents; and ISO 2014 and ISO 3166, which, respectively, establish the correct use of dates and country codes.

Punctuation and style are not part of the standard; largely, the standard governs content rather than presentation.

ISO 690 prescribes a referencing scheme with a fixed order of bibliographic elements in which the publication date appears after the "production information" of place and publisher, but it allows an exception for the Harvard system, in which the date appears after the creator name(s).

The standard allows for three citation methods:

- name and date ("Harvard system"), in which the creator's name and the year of publication of the resource cited are given in the text;
- numeric, in which numerals in the text – either in parentheses, brackets or superscript – refer to resources in the order in which they are first cited; and
- running notes, in which numerals in the text – either in parentheses, brackets or superscript – refer to notes, which are numbered in order of their occurrence in the text.

== Publication history ==
The first edition of the ISO 690 standard was published in 1975.

The second edition, published in 1987, includes elements specific to patent citations, rendering obsolete the ISO 3388:1977 standard devoted to them.

In 1997, ISO published a second part, devoted to the citation of electronic documents. As a consequence, the ISO 690 standard consisted of two separate parts from 1997 to 2010: ISO 690:1987, dealing with documents in general, and ISO 690-2:1997, dealing with electronic documents in particular.

In 2010, these two documents were revised and merged into a single work, constituting the third edition of the standard.

The fourth edition was published in June 2021 as ISO 690:2021.

== Usage ==
In academic publishing, compliance with ISO 690 is often less than rigorous.

== Examples of citation (ISO 690:1987) ==
ISO 690 is copyrighted and not free for distribution. The application of versions preceding the current edition is not considered a fault.

Monographs
Lominandze, DG. Cyclotron waves in plasma. Translated by AN. Dellis; edited by SM. Hamberger. 1st ed. Oxford : Pergamon Press, 1981. 206 p. International series in natural philosophy. Translation of: Ciklotronnye volny v plazme. ISBN 0-08-021680-3.
Parts of a monograph
Parker, TJ. and Haswell, WD. A Text-book of zoology. 5th ed., vol 1. revised by WD. Lang. London : Macmillan 1930. Section 12, Phylum Mollusca, pp. 663–782.
Contributions in a monograph
Wringley, EA. Parish registers and the historian. In Steel, DJ. National index of parish registers. London : Society of Genealogists, 1968, vol. 1, pp. 155–167.
Serials
Communication equipment manufacturers. Manufacturing a Primary Industries Division, Statistics Canada. Preliminary Edition, 1970- . Ottawa : Statistics Canada, 1971– . Annual census of manufacturers. (in English and French). ISSN 0700-0758.
Articles in a serial
Weaver, William. The Collectors: command performances. Photography by Robert Emmet Bright. Architectural Digest, December 1985, vol. 42, no. 12, pp. 126-133.

== See also ==
- Bibliography
- BibTeX
- Documentation
- DIN 1505-2

== Bibliography ==
- Bertin, Marc; Atanassova, Iana (July 2012). "Semantic Enrichment of Scientific Publications and Metadata: Citation Analysis Through Contextual and Cognitive Analysis". D-Lib Magazine. 18 (7/8). doi:10.1045/july2012-bertin. ISSN 1082-9873.
- Delgado López-Cózar, Emilio (1999). "ISO Standards for the Presentation of Scientific Periodicals: Little known and Little used by Spanish Biomedical Journals" (PDF). Journal of Documentation. 55 (3): 288–309. doi:10.1108/EUM0000000007147. ISSN 0022-0418.
- ISO 690:1975 – Documentation – Bibliographical References – Essential and Supplementary Elements (1st ed.). Geneva: International Organization for Standardization. 1975.
- ISO 690:1987 – Documentation – Bibliographic References – Content, Form and Structure (2nd ed.). Geneva: International Organization for Standardization. 1987.
- ISO 690-2:1997 – Information and Documentation – Bibliographic References – Part 2: Electronic Documents or Parts Thereof (2nd ed.). Geneva: International Organization for Standardization. 1997.
- ISO 690:2010 – Information and Documentation – Guidelines for Bibliographic References and Citations to Information Resources (3rd ed.). Geneva: International Organization for Standardization. 2010.
- ISO 690:2021 – Information and Documentation – Guidelines for Bibliographic References and Citations to Information Resources (4th ed.). Geneva: International Organization for Standardization. 2021.
