= Computational law =

Branch of legal informatics

Computational law is the branch of legal informatics concerned with the automation of legal reasoning. What distinguishes Computational Law systems from other instances of legal technology is their autonomy, i.e. the ability to answer legal questions without additional input from human legal experts.

While there are many possible applications of Computational Law, the primary focus of work in the field today is compliance management, i.e. the development and deployment of computer systems capable of assessing, facilitating, or enforcing compliance with rules and regulations.

There are also applications that do not involve governmental laws. The regulations can just as well be the terms of contracts (e.g. delivery schedules, insurance covenants, real estate transactions, financial agreements). They can be the policies of corporations (e.g. constraints on travel, expenditure reporting, pricing rules). They can even be the rules of games (embodied in computer game playing systems).

== History ==
Speculation about potential benefits to legal practice through applying methods from computational science and AI research to automate parts of the law date back at least to the middle 1940s. Further, AI and law and computational law do not seem easily separable, as perhaps most of AI research focusing on the law and its automation appears to utilize computational methods. The forms that speculation took are multiple and not all related in ways to readily show closeness to one another. This history will sketch them as they were, attempting to show relationships where they can be found to have existed.

By 1949, a minor academic field aiming to incorporate electronic and computational methods to legal problems had been founded by American legal scholars, called jurimetrics. Though broadly said to be concerned with the application of the "methods of science" to the law, these methods were actually of a quite specifically defined scope. Jurimetrics was to be "concerned with such matters as the quantitative analysis of judicial behavior, the application of communication and information theory to legal expression, the use of mathematical logic in law, the retrieval of legal data by electronic and mechanical means, and the formulation of a calculus of legal predictability".

These interests led in 1959 to the founding a journal, Modern Uses of Logic in Law, as a forum wherein articles would be published about the applications of techniques such as mathematical logic, engineering, statistics, etc. to the legal study and development. In 1966, this Journal was renamed as Jurimetrics. Today, however, the journal and meaning of jurimetrics seems to have broadened far beyond what would fit under the areas of applications of computers and computational methods to law. Today the journal not only publishes articles on such practices as found in computational law, but has broadened jurimetrical concerns to mean also things like the use of social science in law or the "policy implications [of] and legislative and administrative control of science".

Independently in 1958, at the Conference for the Mechanization of Thought held at the National Physical Laboratory in Teddington, Middlesex, UK, the French jurist Lucien Mehl presented a paper both on the benefits of using computational methods for law and on the potential means to use such methods to automate law for a discussion that included AI luminaries like Marvin Minsky. Mehl believed that the law could by automated by two basic distinct, though not wholly separable, types of machine. These were the "documentary or information machine", which would provide the legal researcher quick access to relevant case precedents and legal scholarship, and the "consultation machine", which would be "capable of answering any question put to it over a vast field of law". The latter type of machine would be able to basically do much of a lawyer's job by simply giving the "exact answer to a [legal] problem put to it".

By 1970, Mehl's first type of machine, one that would be able to retrieve information, had been accomplished but there seems to have been little consideration of further fruitful intersections between AI and legal research. There were, however, still hopes that computers could model the lawyer's thought processes through computational methods and then apply that capacity to solve legal problems, thus automating and improving legal services via increased efficiency as well as shedding light on the nature of legal reasoning. By the late 1970s, computer science and the affordability of computer technology had progressed enough that the retrieval of "legal data by electronic and mechanical means" had been achieved by machines fitting Mehl's first type and were in common use in American law firms. During this time, research focused on improving the goals of the early 1970s occurred, with programs like Taxman being worked on in order to both bring useful computer technology into the law as practical aids and to help specify the exact nature of legal concepts.

Nonetheless, progress on the second type of machine, one that would more fully automate the law, remained relatively inert. Research into machines that could answer questions in the way that Mehl's consultation machine would picked up somewhat in the late 1970s and 1980s. A 1979 convention in Swansea, Wales marked the first international effort solely to focus upon applying artificial intelligence research to legal problems in order to "consider how computers can be used to discover and apply the legal norms embedded within the written sources of the law".

Considerable progress on the development of the second type of machine was made in the following decade, with the development of a variety of expert systems. According to Thorne McCarty, "these systems all have the following characteristics: They do backward chaining inference from a specified goal; they ask questions to elicit information from the user; and they produce a suggested answer along with a trace of the supporting legal rules." According to Prakken and Sartor the representation of the British Nationality Act as a logic program, which introduced this approach, was "hugely influential for the development of computational representations of legislation, showing how logic programming enables intuitively appealing representations that can be directly deployed to generate automatic inferences". In 2021, this work received the Inaugural CodeX Prize as "one of the first and best-known works in computational law, and one of the most widely cited papers in the field."

In a 1988 review of Anne Gardner's book An Artificial Intelligence Approach to Legal Reasoning (1987), the Harvard academic legal scholar and computer scientist Edwina Rissland wrote that "She plays, in part, the role of pioneer; artificial intelligence ("AI") techniques have not yet been widely applied to perform legal tasks. Therefore, Gardner, and this review, first describe and define the field, then demonstrate a working model in the domain of contract offer and acceptance." Eight years after the Swansea conference had passed, and still AI and law researchers merely trying to delineate the field could be described by their own kind as "pioneer[s]".

In the 1990s and early 2000s more progress occurred. Computational research generated insights for law. The First International Conference on AI and the Law occurred in 1987, but it is in the 1990s and 2000s that the biannual conference began to build up steam and to delve more deeply into the issues involved with work intersecting computational methods, AI, and law. Classes began to be taught to undergraduates on the uses of computational methods to automating, understanding, and obeying the law.

Further, by 2005, a team largely composed of Stanford computer scientists from the Stanford Logic group had devoted themselves to studying the uses of computational techniques to the law. Computational methods in fact advanced enough that members of the legal profession began in the 2000s to both analyze, predict and worry about the potential future of computational law and a new academic field of computational legal studies seems to be now well established. As insight into what such scholars see in the law's future due in part to computational law, here is quote from a recent conference about the "New Normal" for the legal profession:

"Over the last 5 years, in the fallout of the Great Recession, the legal profession has entered the era of the New Normal. Notably, a series of forces related to technological change, globalization, and the pressure to do more with less (in both corporate America and law firms) has changed permanently the legal services industry. As one article put it, firms are cutting back on hiring "in order to increase efficiency, improve profit margins, and reduce client costs." Indeed, in its recently noted cutbacks, Weil Gotshal's leaders remarked that it had initially expected old work to return, but came "around to the view that this is the ‘new normal.’"The New Normal provides lawyers with an opportunity to rethink—and reimagine—the role of lawyers in our economy and society. To the extent that law firms enjoyed, or still enjoy, the ability to bundle work together, that era is coming to an end, as clients unbundle legal services and tasks. Moreover, in other cases, automation and technology can change the roles of lawyers, both requiring them to oversee processes and use technology more aggressively as well as doing less of the work that is increasingly managed by computers (think: electronic discovery). The upside is not only greater efficiencies for society, but new possibilities for legal craftsmanship. The emerging craft of lawyering in the New Normal is likely to require lawyers to be both entrepreneurial and fluent with a range of competencies that will enable them to add value for clients. Apropos of the trends noted above, there are emerging opportunities for "legal entrepreneurs" in a range of roles from legal process management to developing technologies to manage legal operations (such as overseeing automated processes) to supporting online dispute resolution processes. In other cases, effective legal training as well as domain specific knowledge (finance, sales, IT, entrepreneurship, human resources, etc.) can form a powerful combination that prepares law school grads for a range of opportunities (business development roles, financial operations roles, HR roles, etc.). In both cases, traditional legal skills alone will not be enough to prepare law students for these roles. But the proper training, which builds on the traditional law school curriculum and goes well beyond it including practical skills, relevant domain knowledge (e.g., accounting), and professional skills (e.g., working in teams), will provide law school students a huge advantage over those with a one-dimensional skill set."

Many see perks to oncoming changes brought about by the computational automation of law. For one thing, legal experts have predicted that it will aid legal self-help, especially in the areas of contract formation, enterprise planning, and the prediction of rule changes. For another thing, those with knowledge about computers see the potential for computational law to really fully bloom as eminent. In this vein, it seems that machines like Mehl's second type may come into existence. Stephen Wolfram has said that:

"So we're slowly moving toward people being educated in the kind of computational paradigm. Which is good, because the way I see it, computation is going to become central to almost every field. Let's talk about two examples—classic professions: law and medicine. It's funny, when Leibniz was first thinking about computation at the end of the 1600s, the thing he wanted to do was to build a machine that would effectively answer legal questions. It was too early then. But now we’re almost ready, I think, for computational law. Where for example contracts become computational. They explicitly become algorithms that decide what's possible and what's not.You know, some pieces of this have already happened. Like with financial derivatives, like options and futures. In the past these used to just be natural language contracts. But then they got codified and parametrized. So they’re really just algorithms, which of course one can do meta-computations on, which is what has launched a thousand hedge funds, and so on. Well, eventually one's going to be able to make computational all sorts of legal things, from mortgages to tax codes to perhaps even patents. Now to actually achieve that, one has to have ways to represent many aspects of the real world, in all its messiness. Which is what the whole knowledge-based computing of Wolfram|Alpha is about."

In Estonia, the government has been spearheading a 'robotic judge' initiative whereby chief data officer Ott Velsberg is implementing elements both adjacent and directly related to computational law. Firstly, inspectors no longer verify the use of hay-field subsidies (that prevent forests) rather they use a deep-learning algorithm to validate the results from satellite comparison thus saving nearly a million dollars per annum. The perceived success of this operation has led to the Estonian government moving ahead with proposals to automate, or compute the law of, small claims disputes beneath $8,000 especially in contract disputes. The decisions will be appealable to a human judge.

== Approaches ==
=== Algorithmic law ===
There have also been many attempts to create a machine readable or machine executable legal code. A machine readable code would simplify the analysis of legal code, allowing the rapid construction and analysis of databases, without the need for advanced text processing techniques. A machine executable format would allow the specifics of a case to be input, and would return the decision based on the case.

Machine readable legal code is already quite common. METAlex, an XML-based standard proposed and developed by the Leibniz Center for Law of the University of Amsterdam, is used by the governments of both the United Kingdom and the Netherlands to encode their laws. In the United States, an executive order issued by President Barack Obama in the May 2013 mandated that all public government documentation be released in a machine readable format by default, although no specific format was mentioned.

Machine executable legal code is much less common. Currently, as of 2020, numerous projects are working on systems for producing machine executable legal code, sometimes also through natural language, constrained language or a connection between natural language and executable code similar to Ricardian Contracts.

=== Empirical analysis ===
Many current efforts in computational law are focused on the empirical analysis of legal decisions, and their relation to legislation. These efforts usually make use of citation analysis, which examines patterns in citations between works. Due to the widespread practice of legal citation, it is possible to construct citation indices and large graphs of legal precedent, called citation networks. Citation networks allow the use of graph traversal algorithms in order to relate cases to one another, as well as the use of various distance metrics to find mathematical relationships between them. These analyses can reveal important overarching patterns and trends in judicial proceedings and the way law is used.

There have been several breakthroughs in the analysis of judicial rulings in recent research on legal citation networks. These analyses have made use of citations in Supreme Court majority opinions to build citation networks, and analyzed the patterns in these networks to identify meta-information about individual decisions, such as the importance of the decision, as well as general trends in judicial proceedings, such as the role of precedent over time. These analyses have been used to predict which cases the Supreme Court will choose to consider.

Another effort has examined United States Tax Court decisions, compiling a publicly available database of Tax Court decisions, opinions, and citations between the years of 1990 and 2008, and constructing a citation network from this database. Analysis of this network revealed that large sections of the tax code were rarely, if ever, cited, and that other sections of code, such as those that dealt with "divorce, dependents, nonprofits, hobby and business expenses and losses, and general definition of income," were involved the vast majority of disputes.

Some research has also been focused on hierarchical networks, in combination with citation networks, and the analysis of United States Code. This research has been used to analyze various aspects of the Code, including its size, the density of citations within and between sections of the Code, the type of language used in the Code, and how these features vary over time. This research has been used to provide commentary on the nature of the Code's change over time, which is characterized by an increase in size and in interdependence between sections.

=== Visualization ===
Visualization of legal code, and of the relationships between various laws and decisions, is also a hot topic in computational law. Visualizations allow both professionals and laypeople to see large-scale relationships and patterns, which may be difficult to see using standard legal analysis or empirical analysis.

Legal citation networks lend themselves to visualization, and many citation networks which are analyzed empirically also have sub-sections of the network that are represented visually as a result. However, there are still many technical problems in network visualization. The density of connections between nodes, and the sheer number of nodes in some cases, can make the visualization incomprehensible to humans. There are a variety of methods that can be used to reduce the complexity of the displayed information, for example by defining semantic sub-groups within the network, and then representing relationships between these semantic groups, rather than between every node. This allows the visualization to be human readable, but the reduction in complexity can obscure relationships. Despite this limitation, visualization of legal citation networks remains a popular field and practice.

== Examples of tools ==
1. OASIS Legal XML, UNDESA Akoma Ntoso, and CEN Metalex, which are standardizations created by legal and technical experts for the electronic exchange of legal data.
2. Creative Commons, which correspond to custom-generated copyright licenses for internet content.
3. Legal Analytics, which combines big data, critical expertise, and intuitive tools to deliver business intelligence and benchmarking solutions.
4. Legal visualizations. Examples include Katz's map of supreme court decisions, Starger's Opinion Lines for the commerce clause and stare decisis., and Surden's visualizations of Copyright Law.

== Online legal resources and databases ==
1. PACER is an online repository of judicial rulings, maintained by the Federal Judiciary.
2. The Law Library of Congress maintains a comprehensive online repository of legal information, including legislation at the international, national, and state levels.
3. The Supreme Court Database is a comprehensive database containing detailed information about decisions made by the Supreme Court from 1946 to the present.
4. The United States Reports contained detailed information about every Supreme Court decision from 1791 to the near-present.

== Software ==
- Akoma Ntoso - parliamentary informatics
- CaseMap
- HotDocs
- PROMIS
- Madison - OpenGov Foundation
- Shyster (expert system)
- Split Up (expert system)
- STORM (AI Tool)
- Vizlegal

== See also ==
- Artificial intelligence and law
- Jurimetrics
- Lawbot
- Legal informatics
- Legal expert systems
