= Painworth =

Legal technology App

- Original author(s): Mike Zouhri, Chris Trudel, Ryan Bencic
- Initial release: 2019; 6 years ago
- Operating system: web
- Available in: English
- Type: Legal technology, robot lawyer, SaaS, Insurance technology
- Website: www.painworth.com

PainWorth is a justice, legal and insurance services application founded by Canadian entrepreneurs Mike Zouhri, Chris Trudel and Ryan Bencic. The application is a "robot lawyer" that uses artificial intelligence to automate personal injury claims for injury victims. It is currently available in Canada and the United States.

PainWorth has been featured by several news outlets, including CTV, Global News, CBC, and has also been featured by the American Bar Association and LexisNexis for its role addressing social issues such as access to justice and other systemic issues in the legal and insurance industry.

== Application ==
PainWorth began as a tool for calculating non-pecuniary damages for injury victims but has since expanded beyond a personal injury calculator to include features that help injury victims and business users with pecuniary damages, economic calculations, prescribed rates and providing informational guides to help navigate settlement negotiation, managing claims records and other issues encountered by self-represented litigants or claims managers.

The platform makes use of automation to provide free user-guided calculations, steps and processes to successfully settle an injury claim. The application is supported by Microsoft Azure.

== Personal Injury Calculator ==
PainWorth is the first service to use Artificial Intelligence to interpret case law in order to determine the value of pain and suffering incurred by specific injury types and injury severities. The cited case law is used as evidence and presented in statistical models to determine an accurate valuation compliant with the jurisdiction, regulatory rules and case complexities.

== General Damages Calculator ==
PainWorth also offers a personal injury settlement calculator that assesses general damages based on specific case complexities and jurisdiction. The service takes into account medical complications and recovery in order to calculate the fair valuation.

== Injury Settlement Platform ==
PainWorth insurance settlement platform facilitates a direct and automated way resolution center to settle cases for their assessed value without enduring the hardship of litigation. In 2021, Painworth won the title of World's Best Emerging Insurance Product for the development of this platform.

== History ==
In 2019, Mike Zouhri was struck by a drunk driver which left him seriously injured and resulted in a lawsuit. Frustrated by the slow and expensive process, Zouhri went down to the law library and learned how to manage injury claims. After learning the process, he partnered lawyers and legal advisors to create an app to allow users to quickly settle their own injury claims fairly and accurately. Immediately after its launch, PainWorth quickly became widely used by thousands of users and gained significant media coverage. Global News reported that the bot had successfully helped people with more than $10 million in claims in only a few short months, all free of charge.

In July 2020, PainWorth began raising concern over injustices and gender bias in the legal system. in Canadian courts.

== See also ==
- Artificial intelligence and law
- Computational law
- Legal expert systems
- Legal informatics
- Legal technology
- Robot lawyer
- insurance technology
