= Suspicious death =

Unexplained cause of death

A death is suspicious if it is unexpected and its circumstances or cause are medically or legally unexplained. Normally, this occurs in the context of medical care, suicide or suspected criminal activity.

== Legal procedure ==
=== United Kingdom ===
In cases of suspicious death in England and Wales, the police are required to contact a coroner, who will open an inquest, which is automatically adjourned to allow the police to continue their investigations. This adjourned inquest means that the death can be officially registered and a temporary death certificate issued. If, as a result of police enquiries, a criminal is charged or an accident is shown to have occurred, a full death certificate is issued. Otherwise, the coroner holds a full inquest. In Scotland, the coroner's functions are carried out by a "procurator fiscal", who is appointed by the Lord Advocate to investigate unexpected or accidental deaths.

Any suspicious death of a British national outside of Britain is required to be investigated through an inquest. When a suspicious death occurs aboard a British naval or merchant vessel, the body is preserved by refrigeration until the ship arrives at port, at which point the police and coroner begin their investigations.

== See also ==
- Postmortem: How Medical Examiners Explain Suspicious Deaths
