= HYPO CBR =

HYPO
- Original authors: Kevin D. Ashley; Edwina Rissland
- Initial release: 1987; 39 years ago
- Written in: Prolog
- Available in: English
- Type: Legal expert system

HYPO is a computer program, an expert system, that models reasoning with cases and hypotheticals in the legal domain. It is the first of its kind and the most sophisticated of the case-based legal reasoners, which was designed by Kevin Ashley for his Ph.D dissertation in 1987 at the University of Massachusetts Amherst under the supervision of Edwina Rissland. HYPO's design represents a hybrid generalization/comparative evaluation method appropriate for a domain with a weak analytical theory and applies to tasks that rarely involve just one right answer. The domain covers US trade secret law, and is substantially a common law domain. Since Anglo-American common law operates under the doctrine of precedent, the definitive way of interpreting problems is of necessity and case-based. Thus, HYPO did not involve the analysis of a statute, as required by the Prolog program. Rissland and Ashley (1987) envisioned HYPO as employing the key tasks performed by lawyers when analyzing case law for precedence to generate arguments for the prosecution or the defence.

HYPO was a successful example of a general category of legal expert systems (LESs), it applies artificial intelligence (A.I.) techniques to the domain of legal reasoning in patent law, implementing a case-based reasoning (CBR) system, in contrast to rule based systems like MYCIN, or mixed-paradigm systems integrating CBR with rule-based or model-based reasoning like IKBALS II. A legal case-based reasoning essentially reasons from prior tried cases, comparing the contextual information in the current input case with that of cases previously tried and entered into the system. As noted by Ashley and Rissland (1988) CBR is used to "... capture expertise in domains where rules are ill-defined, incomplete or inconsistent".

The HYPO project set out to model the creation of hypotheticals in law, where no case matches well enough. HYPO uses hypotheticals for a variety of tasks necessary for good interpretation: "to redefine old situations in terms of new dimensions, to create new standard cases when an appropriate one doesn’t exist, to explore and test the limits of a concept, to refocus a case by excluding some issues and to organize or cluster cases". Hypotheticals can include facts that support two conflicting lines of reasoning. So, it makes and responds to arguments from competing viewpoints about who should win the dispute. HYPO use heuristics such as making a case weaker or stronger, making a case extreme, enabling a near-miss, disabling a near-hit to generate hypotheticals in the context of an argument by using the dimensions mechanism. Dimensions have a range of values, along which the supportive strength that may shift from one side to the other. What differentiated this expert system from others was its facility not only to return a primary to best-case response but to return near-best-fit responses also.

== Components ==
Legal knowledge in HYPO is contained in: the case-knowledge-base (CKB) and the library of dimensions. The CKB contains HYPO's base of known cases that are highly structured objects and sub-objects both real and hypothetical in the area of trade secret law. Each case is represented as a hierarchical set of frames whose slots are important facets of the case (e.g. Plaintiff, defendant, secret knowledge, employer/employee data).Ashley’s HYPO system used a database of thirty cases in the area indexed by thirteen dimensions. A key mechanism in HYPO is a dimension i.e. a mechanism to allow retrieval from the CKB, in order to represent legal cases. Ashley's dimensions are composed of (i) prerequisites, which are a set of factual predicates that must be satisfied for the dimension to apply (ii) focal slots, which accommodate one or two of the dimension's prerequisites designated as being indicative of the case's strength along that dimension and (iii) range information, which tells how a change in focal slot value effects the strength of a party's case along a given dimension. Dimensions focus attention on important aspects of cases. In HYPO's domain of misappropriation of trade secrets the dimension called “secrets voluntary disclosed” captures the idea that the more disclosures the plaintiff has made of his/her putative secret, the less convincing is his/her argument that the defendant is responsible for letting the secret.

HYPO, like any other CBR system has also the following components:

- Similarity/relevancy metrics: that is, standards by which to evaluate the closeness of cases, judge their relevancy to the instant case, and select “most on point” cases.
- Half-Order Theory of the Application Domain: that is, hierarchies and taxonomies of knowledge, especially regarding the application domain.
- Precedent-based argumentation abilities: that is, capabilities to generate and evaluate precedent-based arguments.
- Knowledge to generate hypotheticals: that is, the ability to generate hypothetical cases to deal with various circumstances, like testing the validity of an interpretation or argument by providing gedanken experiments such as test cases or to fill in a weak CKB.

== Functions ==
HYPO's method of creating an argument and justifying a solution or position has several steps. HYPO begins its processing with the current fact situation (cfs) which is direct input by the user into HYPO's representation framework. Once the user inputs the case, HYPO begins its legal analysis. The cfc is analyzed for relevant factors. Based on these factors HYPO selects the relevant cases and produces a case-analysis-record that records which dimensions apply to the cfc and which nearly apply (i.e. are "near misses"). The combined list of applicable and near miss dimensions is called the D-list. At this point the fact gathered module may request additional information from the user in order to draw a legal conclusion. Once all the facts are in the case-positioner module it uses the case-analysis record to create the claim lattice. This is a technique that organizes the relevant retrieved cases from the point of view of the cfc and makes it easy for HYPO to ascertain the most-on point cases (mopc) and to least on-point-cases. HYPO's arguments are 3ply, leading to the construction of the skeleton of an argument: it makes a point for one side, drawing the analogy between the problem and the precedent, responds with an argument for the opponent side, endeavoring to differentiate the cited case and citing other cases as counterarguments. Then it makes a final rebuttal, attempting to differentiate the counterarguments. The claim lattice also enables the HYPO-generator module to produce legally hypotheticals. With its use of dimension-based heuristics, the HYPO-generator does a heuristic search of the space of all possible cases. Lastly, the Explanation module expands upon the argument skeleton and provides explanation and justification for the different lines of analysis and cases found by HYPO.

== An intelligent legal tutoring system ==
Legal expert systems are specifically designed to teach an area of law and are useful for pedagogical purposes. Ashley's work was mainly concerned to build tools to help students understand legal reasoning. Explanation and argument are the bases of the case method used in many professional schools in the U.S., first introduced by the Dean of the Harvard Law School, Christopher Columbus Langdell in 1870. The case method focuses on close readings of cases and principles; it involves students in pointed Socratic dialogue and makes strong use of hypotheticals (hypos). Thus, CATO (Aleven 1997) was a research project to device and test an intelligent, case-based tutorial program for teaching law students how to argue with cases implementing the HYPO program. Within the tutor system, Ashley and Aleven (1991) proposed to leverage an understanding of legal reasoning against the standard case-based tutoring methodology. What makes this tutoring system stand out is the additional levels of abstraction involved in its results. The system presents exercises, including the facts of a problem and a set of on-line cases and instructions to make, or respond to, a legal argument about the problem. The student/user will have a set of tools to analyze the problem and fashion an answer comparing it to other cases. Instead of simply generating precedent cases, the system works to interpret student responses, comparing them against a list of possibilities and responding to student entries, for example, by citing counterexamples, and providing feedback on a student's problem solving activities with explanations of correctness or giving further hints as to what may be wrong with evaluating a student's ability to perform legal reasoning and argument, examples and follow-up assignments by employing HYPO's model of case-based structure.

== HYPO’s progeny ==
The quality of HYPO's results speak for themselves, in that a number of sequent legal reasoning systems are either directly based upon HYPO's mechanisms as in the case of Kowalski (1991), TAX-HYPO, precedent case-based system operating in the statutory domain of tax law (Rissland and Skalak 1989), CABARET, a mixed-paradigm cases and rule system for the income tax law domain, (Skalak and Rissland 1992), CATO, IBP, developed for argumentation to make predictions based on argumentation concepts (Brüninghaus and Ashley 2003), or their creators at least pay homage to HYPO in their discussions (Henderson and Bench-Capon 2001).

== See also ==
- Computational model
- Government by algorithm
- Hypothesis
- Hypothetical syllogism
- Janet L. Kolodner
- Knowledge-based systems
- Rule-based system
- Legal information retrieval
- Logical reasoning
- Problem solving
- Shyster (expert system)
- Socratic method
