= James Popple =

Australian lawyer (born 1964)

James Popple BA LLB PhD FAAL
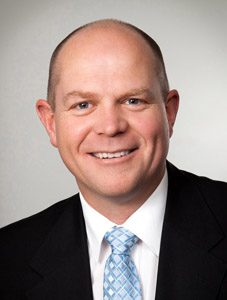
- Born: 4 November 1964 (age 61); Mirboo, Victoria, Australia
- Education: BA; LLB; PhD (ANU)
- Alma mater: Australian National University

First Australian Freedom of Information Commissioner
- In office 1 November 2010 – 31 December 2014

Senior Member, Administrative Appeals Tribunal
- In office 1 January 2015 – 31 December 2017

Official Secretary to the Royal Commission into Aged Care Quality and Safety
- In office 8 October 2018 – 26 February 2021

Official Secretary to the Royal Commission into Defence and Veteran Suicide
- In office 8 July 2021 – 11 July 2022

Chief Executive Officer, Law Council of Australia
- In office 25 July 2022 – present
- Website: www.popple.net/james

James Popple (born 1964) is CEO of the Law Council of Australia. He is also an Honorary Professor in the College of Law and the College of Engineering and Computer Science at the Australian National University, and a Fellow of the Australian Academy of Law.

He was President of the ANU's Postgraduate and Research Students' Association (1990–91); associate to High Court Justice Mary Gaudron (1995); Deputy Registrar of the High Court of Australia (1996–98); a senior executive in the Australian Attorney-General's Department (1998–2010); the first Australian Freedom of Information Commissioner (2010–14); a Senior Member of the Administrative Appeals Tribunal (2015–17); a Principal Reviewer at CPM Reviews Pty Ltd (2018); a member of the Australian Anti-Dumping Review Panel (2018–21); a member of the ACT Remuneration Tribunal (2018–22); Official Secretary to the Royal Commission into Aged Care Quality and Safety (2018–21); and Official Secretary to the Royal Commission into Defence and Veteran Suicide (2021–22).

He has been a member of the Council of Burgmann College, ANU since 1985.

As part of his PhD research at the ANU (1993), he developed a legal expert system called SHYSTER.

Government offices
| New title | Australian Freedom of Information Commissioner; 1 November 2010 – 31 December 2014 | Vacant Office not filled until 19 April 2022 Title next held by Leo Hardiman |
| Preceded by Robin Creyke | Senior Member, Administrative Appeals Tribunal; 1 January 2015 – 31 December 2017 | Vacant Office not filled, in Canberra Registry, until 25 February 2019 Title next held by Damien O'Donovan |
| New title | Official Secretary to the Royal Commission into Aged Care Quality and Safety; 8 October 2018 – 26 February 2021 | Royal Commission concluded |
| New title | Official Secretary to the Royal Commission into Defence and Veteran Suicide; 8 July 2021 – 11 July 2022 | Unknown |
Other offices
| Preceded by Michael Tidball | Chief Executive Officer, Law Council of Australia; 25 July 2022 – present | Incumbent |
