= Quantitative methods in criminology =

Quantitative methods in criminology is an umbrella term used to describe statistical tools and approaches used to objectively measure and analyze crime-related data. The methods are the primary research methods for examining the distribution, trends and causes of crime. Data is collected through various methods such as field research and survey research that is often used by social scientists and criminologists to establish causal relationships amongst variables as well as understand patterns over time.

== History and development ==
Criminology, the scientific study of crime, criminals, criminal behavior, and corrections, was first seen in Cesare Beccaria’s 1764 work titled On Crimes and Punishment. However, the integration of quantitative methods in the field of criminology occurred later during the 19th-century resurgence of positivism spearheaded by well-known sociologist Émile Durkheim. His 1897 work titled "Suicide" was one of the first documented works to use quantitative methods, using data to calculate suicide rates across populations. One of the first recorded studies in the United States utilizing quantitative methods in criminology was done by sociologist and economist Richard Dugdale in 1874 in a study titled "The Jukes: A Study in Crime, Pauperism, Disease and Heredity". The study aimed to examine the role of heredity and environment in criminal behaviors. Scientists used data derived from recorded convictions, environment, and social experiments. Some early criminologist theorists were Karl Marx, Cesare Lombroso, Jeremy Bentham, and Émile Durkheim and since their days, there have not been many changes to how quantitative methods in criminology are conducted.

== Key Concepts and Definitions ==
Quantitative research methods in criminology are defined as techniques that record variations in social life through categories that can be quantified, often involving surveys and experiments. According to Russell K. Schutt, these methods are characterized by data that "are either numbers or attributes that can be ordered in terms of magnitude". This approach to research distinguishes itself from qualitative methods by striving for objectivity; it relies less on subjective interpretation and more on impartial analysis of numerical data to draw conclusions about criminal behavior and its implications. A potential aim of quantitative research is to provide a more objective analysis that is not influenced by the researcher's personal biases or interpretations.

1. Quantitative Methods: A research tool that specifically uses numerical data to formulate trends and come to conclusions.
2. Data Collection Techniques: Ways in which researchers gather data. Examples include interviews, observation, forms and surveys.
3. Correlation: a statistical measure that showcases the extent to which two variables fluctuate together.
4. Causation: one event resulting in the occurrence of another event.
5. Statistical Population: It refers to the group of units on which information is being gathered and analyzed.

== Quantitative Tools ==
=== Official Statistics ===
Law-enforcement structures like FBI's Uniform Crime Reports or Non-Government Organizations (NGOs) have thorough databases that are utilized. They are primarily based on observations from by-standers or police reports and different organizations have different definitions and reports of crime so these reports are not fully accurate.

=== Victimization Reports ===
Individual reports and recounts of crimes can also be used as a source of data. These are usually collected in the form of surveys such as National Crime Victimization Survey (NCVS). The NCVS yields data on individual victims, offenders, and incidents. The survey is designed to represent nationwide levels of crime, but cannot provide crime estimates for cities or states. Surveys such as these also obtain information that has not been reported to authorities and also preserves anonymity, eliciting more responses.

=== Offender Surveys ===
Offender surveys, such as The Offending, Crime and Justice Survey (OCJS) measure the volume of crime committed by an offender. Surveys like these are helpful to garner data for victimless crimes, like prostitution, public order and delinquency crimes, and rarely reported crimes, like shoplifting.

=== Official Archives ===
Official archives such as courtroom documents, police reports and departmental records can be utilized to analyze and record trends.

*Note: There are other methods to gather data. The above contain some faults and hence, a combination of these methods is advised.

== Descriptive analysis and comparison ==
The quality of data must be evaluated which can efficiently done by access to raw and published data, the former eradicating possible biases. Additionally, it may be useful to compare newly collected data (primary data) with previously collected data (secondary data). Primary data can confirm newly found data and differences in data can point out problematic areas.

== Impacts and benefits ==
=== Empirical Evidence ===
Quantitative methods enable objective measures of crime trends, patterns and rates and reduces the use of anecdotal evidence.

=== Predictive Modeling ===
Law enforcement and researchers can use data to predict potential crimes and causes, as well as utilize it to draw up crime prevention strategies.

=== Theoretical Explanations ===
Quantitative analysis can provide support for theoretical explanations of crime and help prove and disprove theories regarding it. Specific hypotheses can also be tested and the theory can be refined.

== Measurement challenges ==
=== Under-reporting ===
A number of factors influence whether a crime is reported and whether the police put it under official police records. For instance, crimes involving individuals familiar with each other are less likely be recorded than those involving strangers. Victims often choose to not press charges on an offender they know and therefore, this will not be reported officially.

=== Regional Variations ===
Arrest practices vary according to the counties that the crimes are committed in. In densely populated urban areas, police prioritize serious crimes and allocate resources accordingly, leading to underreporting of minor crimes. In less populated areas with lower crime rates, police have more resources available for smaller crimes and hence, they are reported more.

Additionally, laws vary from region to region, like the marijuana laws. Several states in the United States have passed decriminalization laws, which call for allowing the possession or use of small amounts of marijuana, and would impose fines, rather than prison terms for transgressions of minor marijuana laws. The difference in laws hurts the measurement of crimes because crimes in one region may not be measurable in another.

== Ongoing and future developments in tools for criminology ==
=== Artificial intelligence ===
Law enforcement is starting to integrate artificial intelligence models to predict potential locations, people and crimes based on past data.

=== Facial recognition ===
Law enforcement is looking to implement facial recognition tools to identify and locate people of interest, as well as enhance surveillance systems. This will build upon the camera system most locations have already enforced.

== See also ==
- Bayes' theorem
- Criminology
- Spatial analysis
- Hierarchical Linear Modeling
- Machine learning
- Geographic Information Systems
- Computational criminology
- Forensic statistics
- Journal of Quantitative Criminology
- Jurimetrics
- Predictive policing
- Social network analysis (criminology)
- Qualitative research in criminology
