= Pro bono (disambiguation) =

Pro bono or Pro Bono may refer to:

- Pro bono, professional work, especially in the form of legal services, that is done voluntarily and without pay
- Pro Bono, a South Korean legal drama television series
- Pro Bono Net, a nonprofit organization that provides legal aid in the United States and Canada
- Pro Bono Poloniae Medal, a Polish departmental decoration
- Pro Bono Radio (Queen's University), a campus radio station at Queen's University in Kingston, Ontario, Canada
