= Split Up =

Split Up may refer to:

- Split Up (expert system)
- "Split Up" (Runaways), an episode of Runaways
