= Open Data Buffalo =

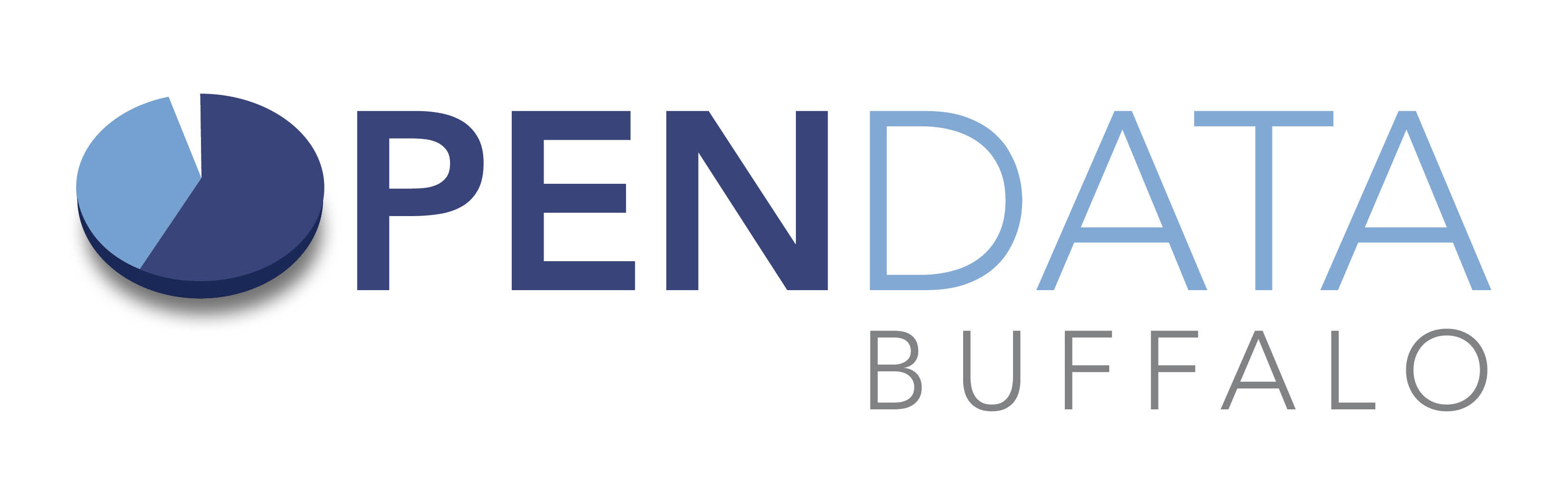

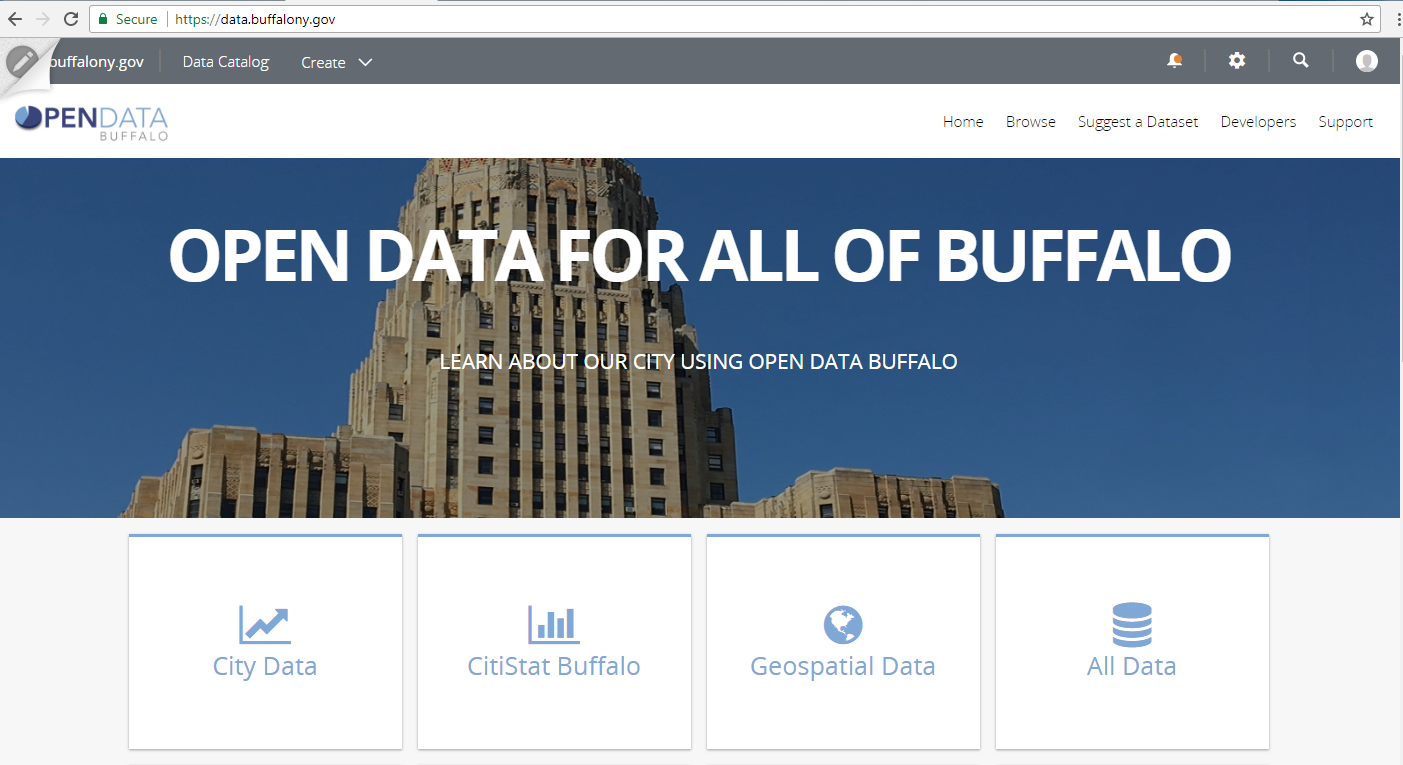
- Screenshot Screenshot of Open Data Buffalo portal.
- Website type: Open Data Portal
- Owner: United StatesCity of Buffalo
- Creator: Open Data Buffalo Program
- Website: data.buffalony.gov
- Commercial: No
- Launched: February 22, 2018
- Content license: Public Domain

Open Data Buffalo is the open data program developed under the administration of Mayor Byron W. Brown in Buffalo, New York. The initiative is a commitment to proactively release high-quality, updated "publishable City data" through a centralized portal in machine-readable formats, fully accessible and freely available in the public domain. Open Data Buffalo is an official City program designed to foster transparency, innovation, accountability, and efficiency.

== History ==
In May 2013, Buffalo earned a grant through IBM's Smarter Cities Challenge to bring a team of senior IBM executives to the city to offer advice on improving municipal policy with data-driven insights. One of their primary recommendations was for Buffalo to build capacity in "data-sharing and governance." Three years later, Buffalo joined the national network of Bloomberg Philanthropies What Works Cities to expand their use of data. With the support of What Works Cities, Buffalo partnered with The Sunlight Foundation to craft an Open Data Policy with input from the public using the Madison tool, an open-source platform provided by OpenGov Foundation.

In September 2017, the City of Buffalo selected Socrata as the provider for the municipality's open data platform. The city launched the Open Data Buffalo portal on February 22, 2018 and kicked off the launch with the open of Mayor Byron W. Brown's Civic Innovation Challenge Powered By AT&T, a tech competition designed to promote local engagement with the portal. The competition's challenge statement asks innovators to use City data to create solutions to address social and civic issues impacting Buffalo residents.

== Datasets ==
As of October 2019, the Open Data Buffalo data catalog is federated with the New York State portal and includes over 654 data sets and 222 geospatial assets, over 60 of which are City publications. Buffalo's datasets and geospatial assets include:

Asset	Type
Combined Sewer Overflows	Geospatial
Rental Registry	Dataset
True Tax 2018-19	Dataset
Rental Registry	Dataset
City Website Analytics	Dataset
Recyclable Materials	Dataset
In Rem 52 Final Auction Results (10/15/18 - 10/17/18)	Dataset
Housing Court Cases	Dataset
Current In Rem List (2019)	Dataset
2019-2020 Assessment Roll	Dataset
Licensed Contractors	Dataset
Business Licenses	Dataset
Code Violations	Dataset
Neighborhood Metrics	Dataset
City of Buffalo Public Art Inventory	Dataset
City of Buffalo 2017 Recycling Report	External File
Neighborhoods	Geospatial
Local Historic Districts	Geospatial
Zip Codes	Geospatial
Assessment Residential Neighborhoods	Geospatial
Permits	Dataset
Crime Incidents	Dataset
311 Service Requests	Dataset
Parking Summonses	Dataset
Tows	Dataset
2017-2018 Assessment Roll	Dataset
Neighborhood Curbside Recycling Rates	Dataset
Tree Inventory	Dataset
Monthly Recycling and Waste Collection Statistics	Dataset
Monthly Uniform Crime Reporting (UCR) Program Statistics	Dataset
Annual Average Daily Traffic Volume Counts	Dataset
2018 - 2019 Assessment Roll	Dataset
Buffalo Public Schools	Dataset
Zoning Map	Geospatial
Streets	Geospatial
Buffalo Police Department Camera Locations	Geospatial
Parking Meters	Geospatial
2015-2016 City of Buffalo Clean Sweep Locations	Geospatial
U.S. Census Block Groups in Buffalo	Geospatial
BPD Districts	Geospatial
Fire Hydrants	Geospatial
U.S. Census Blocks in Buffalo	Geospatial
Buffalo Police Department Stations	Geospatial
U.S. Census Tracts in Buffalo	Geospatial
BPD Calls to 311 (1/1/17 – Present)	Geospatial
2016 City of Buffalo Clean Sweep Locations	Geospatial
Assessment Commercial Valuation Districts	Geospatial
Railroads	Geospatial
Parks	Geospatial
Municipal Boundary	Geospatial
Council Districts	Geospatial
Police Districts	Geospatial
2015 City of Buffalo Clean Sweep Locations	Geospatial
