= Shyster (disambiguation) =

A shyster is generally a charlatan, a person practising quackery or some similar confidence trick in order to obtain money or advantage by pretense.

Shyster may also refer to:

- Sylvester Shyster, a fictional villain & dictator in the Mickey Mouse universe
- SS-3 Shyster, the NATO name for the Soviet R-5 missile during the Cold War
- SHYSTER, a legal expert system
- Shyster, an enemy in Super Mario RPG
