= Lawbot =

Programmed bot to automate legal tasks

Lawbots are a broad class of customer-facing legal AI applications that are used to automate specific legal tasks, such as document automation and legal research. The terms robot lawyer and lawyer bot are used as synonyms to lawbot. A robot lawyer or a robo-lawyer refers to a legal AI application that can perform tasks that are typically done by paralegals or young associates at law firms. However, there is some debate on the correctness of the term. Some commentators say that legal AI is technically speaking neither a lawyer nor a robot and should not be referred to as such. Other commentators believe that the term can be misleading and note that the robot lawyer of the future will not be one all-encompassing application but a collection of specialized bots for various tasks.

Lawbots use various artificial intelligence techniques or other intelligent systems to limit humans' direct ongoing involvement in certain steps of a legal matter. The user interfaces on lawbots vary from smart searches and step-by-step forms to chatbots. Consumer and enterprise-facing lawbot solutions often do not require direct supervision from a legal professional. Depending on the task, some client-facing solutions used at law firms operate under an attorney supervision.

== Levels of autonomy ==
The following levels of autonomy (LoA) are suggested for automated AI legal reasoning:

- Level 0 (LoA0): No automation for AI legal reasoning
- Level 1 (LoA1): Simple assistance automation
- Level 2 (LoA2): Advanced assistance automation
- Level 3 (LoA3): Semi-autonomous automation
- Level 4 (LoA4): Domain automation
- Level 5 (LoA5): Fully-autonomous automation
- Level 6 (LoA6): Superhuman automation

== Examples ==
Some legal AI solutions are developed and marketed directly to the customers or consumers, whereas other applications are tools for the attorneys at law firms. There are already hundreds of legal AI solutions that operate in multitude of ways varying in sophistication and dependence on scripted algorithms.

One notable legal technology chatbot application is DoNotPay. It had started off as an app for contesting parking tickets, but has since expanded to include features that help users with many different types of legal issues, ranging from consumer protection to immigration rights and other social issues.

== Impact on the legal industry ==
In the 2016 report, Deloitte estimated that more than 110,000 law jobs in just the United Kingdom alone could disappear within the next twenty years due to automation. This change could result in the creation of more highly skilled jobs and in the reduction of paralegal and temporary positions. Deloitte's report asserts that "there is significant potential for high-skilled roles that involve repetitive processes to be automated by smart and self-learning algorithms". According to Lawyers to Engage, between 22% of a lawyer’s work and 35% of a legal assistant’s work can be automated in the US. Top law schools like Harvard have already begun to integrate Artificial Intelligence into the curriculum.

Legal tech start-up companies have begun developing applications that assist law firms with completing low-risk legal processes. These applications can enable lawyers to focus on more work that requires their specific expertise.

The automation of processes like contract reviewing, enforcement of negotiations (smart contracts) and client intake (expert systems) allows law firms to streamline their procedures and improve efficiency. In addition, automation benefits small-to-medium law firms that do not have the resources to utilize junior talent on such routine tasks.

The increase of law firms utilizing automated applications could result into legal tech becoming a necessity in the industry. Digital Reason CEO, Tim Estes, stated that those who refuse the opportunity to integrate AI in their workflow are “most at risk.”

In 2018, Forbes reported a 713% increase in investments in legal tech. This rapid growth is reflective of law firms beginning to “cede business to… new model legal providers… that meld technological, business and legal expertise.”

== Access to law and justice ==
It has been widely estimated for at least the last generation that all the programs and resources devoted to ensuring access to justice address only 20% of the civil legal needs of low-income people in the United States. Drawing on this experience, in late 2011, the U.S. government-funded Legal Services Corporation decided to convene a summit of leaders to explore how best to use technology in the access-to-justice community. The group adopted a mission for The Summit on the Use of Technology to Expand Access to Justice (Summit) consistent with the magnitude of the challenge: "to explore the potential of technology to move the United States toward providing some form of effective assistance to 100% of persons otherwise unable to afford an attorney for dealing with essential civil legal needs".

In April 2017, joined by Microsoft and Pro Bono Net, the Legal Services Corporation (LSC) announced a pilot program to develop online, statewide legal portals to direct individuals with civil legal needs to the most appropriate forms of assistance.

== Technological limitations ==
Current research in subjects such as computational privacy, explainable machine learning, Bayesian deep learning, knowledge-intensive machine learning, and transfer learning reveals that we do not yet have the technology to enable Level 4 to 6 AI lawbots.

In 2023, OpenLaw began developing a model called Law Bot, which interacts in a conversational way as an attorney. The dialogue format makes it possible for Law Bot to answer follow-up questions, challenge incorrect premises, and reject inappropriate requests. Currently, they try to ensure it is in full compliance with all laws and regulations while conducting further beta testing before releasing it to the general public.

== See also ==
- Applications of artificial intelligence
- Automation
- Artificial intelligence and law
- Computational law
- Document automation
- DoNotPay
- Government by algorithm
- Legal expert systems
- Legal informatics
- Legal technology
