= Duolog =

Irish electronic design automation company

Duolog Technologies
- Industry: EDA
- Founded: 1999
- Fate: Acquired
- Headquarters: Dublin, Ireland
- Key people: Ray Bulger (CEO) David Murray (CTO) Norman Walsh (COO)
- Website: www.duolog.com

Duolog Technologies was an Irish-based company that developed electronic design automation tools that assist with the integration of complex system-on-Chip (SoC), ASIC and FPGA designs. In 2014, Duolog was acquired by Arm Holdings plc, a multinational semiconductor and software design company headquartered in Cambridge, United Kingdom.

== Overview ==
Duolog was founded in 1999 and headquartered in Dublin, Ireland. Duolog provided design services to semiconductor companies as well as developing semiconductor intellectual property cores (IP) for wireless technologies, including IEEE 802.11 (Wi-Fi) and IEEE 802.15.4 Zigbee. Duolog also developed software tools to assist in the integration of the system's various IP components. These tools were based on the IP-XACT industry standard.

== See also ==
- Vizlegal
- Steorn
