= Australian Freedom of Information Commissioner =

The Australian Freedom of Information Commissioner is an independent statutory office-holder appointed under subsection 14(2) of the Australian Information Commissioner Act 2010. As one of the three commissioners in the Office of the Australian Information Commissioner, the Freedom of Information Commissioner has responsibilities related to freedom of information and privacy.

Dr James Popple was the first Australian Freedom of Information Commissioner, appointed in 2010. Leo Hardiman is the second FOI Commissioner, appointed in April 2022, after the office had been vacant for more than seven years.
