= Qualitative research in criminology =

Qualitative research in criminology consists of research in the criminology field that employs qualitative methods. There are many applications of this research, and they can often intersect with quantitative research in criminology in order to create mixed method studies.

This type of research is key to holistic views of criminological theory (theories of crime, or within the field of criminology), as it is much more capable of establishing context than empirical data alone. There are also some academics who consider qualitative research to be the superior method of research in criminology, yet this does not mean that it is more commonly used. In fact, quantitative research is much more frequently published in criminology journals.

== Characteristics and terminology ==
The characteristics of the research itself are equal to those in qualitative methods overall. However, the characteristics as they relate to criminology relate most closely to the research's applicability. Generally, qualitative methods are used to supplement quantitative data – particularly by establishing background and/or applicability.

Terminology includes:

- Ethnography – A general definition of ethnography is the field of studying people and cultures. As applied to the criminology field, ethnography generally is applied to one of three areas:
  - Criminal subcultures (i.e. drug trade)
  - Policing
  - Areas (i.e. neighborhoods with particularly high crime rates)
- Ethnomethodology – This study of how social orders are developed and maintained is particularly applicable in high crime areas, any structure of organized crime or transnational crime, or even within the policing hierarchy to identify patterns amongst officers and their superiors.
- Grounded Theory – This method's primary strength is the concept of building a theory out of collected findings, establishing theories from patterns of data.
- Narrative Analysis – Narrative analysis is applied to criminology primarily in the notion of profiling, or building findings based on narrative patterns of behavior. The applicability in this field primarily stems from narrative psychology and in conjunction with policing techniques.

== Common methods of data collection ==
=== Participant observation ===
Participant observation can take many forms, but generally it will take one of the three following:

1. Complete observation – In this form of participant observation, the researcher is completely removed from the activity they are observing. All of the individuals they interact with are fully aware that they are a researcher conducting observation, and that may inform their willingness to interact with the researcher.
2. Participation and observation – In this form, the researcher is participating alongside the subjects of their research, while making it known that they are a researcher conducting observation.
3. Covert participation – This is the most discreet form of participation, wherein a researcher does not publicize the information that they are conducting research. Generally, the intent is to enter a community as a peer and observe internally in order to then report their findings after the fact.

=== Intensive interviewing ===
Intensive interviewing is a form of interview wherein the researcher uses primarily broad, open-ended questions in order to obtain in-depth information about the interviewee's experiences, thoughts, reactions, and feelings.

=== Focus groups ===
Focus groups generally entail a largely unstructured group interview, in which the interviewer actively encourages interaction and discussion among participants.

This is largely relevant when considering policy matters or perception of crime, as the interviewees do not have to be particularly affected by the subject matter at hand.

One fault of this method is that it can be largely unrepresentative, and individuals' participation can be influenced or changed by the input of others in the room. Researchers can often mitigate this by conducting multiple focus groups and comparing the various outcomes and discussions.

=== Case studies and historical examples ===
One significant difficulty pertaining to research in the criminological sphere is the inability to conduct experiments. As with some other fields, the scope of criminological issues is so broad that it is nearly always impossible to conduct experiments pertaining to policy (i.e. it would be unethical to subject prisoners at random to higher levels of freedom than others for the sake of experiments, or sentence prisoners at random to longer sentences to observe the effects of increased captivity). Therefore, a common method used to analyze policy practices are case studies and historical examples. These can be local in a specific jurisdiction, on any scale up to and including international treaties. These case studies aid researchers to determine and anticipate potential outcomes of specific policy proposals.

== Data analysis ==
As with the characteristics of this research, much of the data analysis methods are directly comparable to analysis methods of qualitative research in general, and there does not seem to be certain methods that are used more than others within the qualitative research space.

One key method of data collection and analysis in qualitative methods that is used quite often in criminology is that of progressive focusing. This method involves a researcher beginning with a broad research question or area of investigation, and then progressively narrowing their focus based on their preliminary findings. This method is particularly applicable in criminological research due to the number of subcultures within criminal trades. It is also a key method used in criminal investigations, and so is present in any case research.

== Ethical issues ==
There are several ethical issues that researchers most commonly face in this field, including the following:

- Voluntary participation – This is particularly concerning when it comes to participant observation, and most notably covert participant observation. Due to the nature of criminological research, there are many individuals who may not want to be observed as they may fear for their safety (both from a legal standpoint or for fear of retribution from those they interact with).
- Identity disclosure – This raises the question of legal responsibility of reporting criminal activity vs safeguarding the anonymity of participants. Particularly in the case of covert observation, where individuals are not aware that their activities are being observed, identity disclosure is rare.
- Researcher safety – Similarly, though this is applicable to all methods of data collection, it is particularly applicable when considering participant observation. Given that a researcher can be interacting with criminal enterprises, prison inmates, etc. it is important that their safety remain protected through the process by whatever safeguards they are able to establish, such as check-ins with a partner, any support from individuals within the community, etc.

== See also ==
- Qualitative research
- Quantitative methods in criminology
