= Postmortem: How Medical Examiners Explain Suspicious Deaths =

2006 book by Stefan Timmermans

- Authors: Stefan Timmermans
- Language: English
- Subjects: Medical sociology
- Publisher: University of Chicago Press
- Publication date: 15 June 2006
- Publication place: United States
- Media type: Print (hardcover, Paperback)
- Pages: 384
- Awards: Foundation for the Sociology of Health & Illness' Book of the Year Prize (2007); Eliot Freidson Outstanding Publication Award (2006)
- ISBN: 9780226803982

Postmortem: How Medical Examiners Explain Suspicious Deaths is a 2006 book by the sociologist Stefan Timmermans, published by University of Chicago Press. Postmortem is an ethnographic study based on fieldwork conducted at a medical examiner's office and through attending autopsies. Through the book, Timmermans addresses how medical examiners' conclusions become authoritative and how these conclusions are questioned and defended. The book received the American Sociological Association's Section on Medical Sociology's Eliot Friedson Outstanding Publication award in 2006. The book was also awarded the Foundation for the Sociology of Health & Illness' Book of the Year Prize in 2007.

== Description ==
Postmortem is based on 36 months of ethnographic fieldwork, during which Timmermans attended and observed over 225 autopsies, joined case assignment meetings, reviewed case files, and interviewed staff at a medical examiner's office. Through the book, Timmermans addresses cases involving heart disease, suicide, homicide, Sudden Infant Death Syndrome, and controversies surrounding organ and tissue donation. Renee R. Anspach summarised that in the book Timmermans develops "a medical sociology of practice that describes what medical examiners actually do" that differs from "the idealized image of scientific super sleuths seen on television". Following in the model of laboratory studies, Timmermans provides a process-oriented understanding of how the facts involved in determining the outcomes of suspicious deaths are constructed. Kevin D. Haggerty, in a review for The Canadian Journal of Sociology, summarised Timmermans' findings as showing that medical examiners' work is "shaped by their need to be keenly attuned to how powerful audiences might interpret their findings".

== Reception ==
Cyril H. Wecht, in a review for Jurimetrics, wrote: "It is difficult to conceive how someone with no formal education, postgraduate training, practical experience, and acquired expertise in either medicine or law could possibly write such a perceptive, comprehensive, and erudite book dealing with the rather scientifically complex field of forensic pathology."

Writing in Contemporary Sociology, Renee R. Anspach said that "what makes Postmortem stand out sociologically is Timmermans’ analysis of the organizational ecology or network of stake-holders in which death investigators are embedded." Anspach saw the book's goal as showing "how the postmortem examination is shaped by transactions between pathologists and their knowledge networks". Anspach praised the book as "both sophisticated and empirically rich", stating that it is "well-written, cogently argued, and engrossing".

Reviewing the book for the American Journal of Sociology, Trevor Pinch described Postmortem as a "fascinating and densely argued book". Pinch suggested that "the only thing missing is medical examiners' own reflections on how they cope with their macabre profession".

=== Awards ===
- ASA Section on Medical Sociology's Eliot Friedson Outstanding Publication award (2006).
- Foundation for the Sociology of Health & Illness' Book of the Year Prize (2007).
