= Lee Loevinger =

American judge

Commissioner of the Federal Communications Commission
- In office June 11, 1963 – June 30, 1968
- President: John F. Kennedy; Lyndon B. Johnson

Personal details
- Born: April 24, 1913 Saint Paul, Minnesota, U.S.
- Died: April 26, 2004 (aged 91) Washington, D.C., U.S.
- Party: Democratic

Lee Loevinger (April 24, 1913 – April 26, 2004) was an American jurist and lawyer.

Born in Saint Paul, Minnesota, Loevinger received his bachelor's degree from University of Minnesota in 1933 and his law degree from University of Minnesota Law School in 1936. He later practiced law in Kansas City, Missouri. Loevinger served in the United States Navy during World War II. In 1960 and 1961, Loevinger served on the Minnesota Supreme Court. From 1961 to 1963, Loevinger served as a United States Assistant Attorney General in the Department of Justice Antitrust Division. Loevinger then was a member of the Federal Communications Commission from 1963 to 1968. Loevinger then practiced law in Washington, D.C. He died in Washington, D.C.

== Father of jurimetrics ==
Loevinger is known for coining the term jurimetrics, the use of probability and statistics to answer legal questions, in a 1949 Minnesota Law Review article.
