= Leibniz Center for Law =

The Leibniz Center for Law has its roots in the former department of Computer Science & Law of the law faculty of the University of Amsterdam, and currently houses about 15 researchers. The Leibniz Center conducts research and provides education in the field of Artificial Intelligence and law. In the tradition of Leibniz, the Leibniz Center for Law has its focus on the development and application of techniques from Artificial Intelligence to the field of law for the purpose of supporting legal practice, and bringing new insights to legal theory.

The Leibniz Center for Law has experience on legal ontologies, automatic legal reasoning and legal knowledge-based systems, (standard) languages for representing legal knowledge and information, user-friendly disclosure of legal data, and the application of ICT in education and legal practice (e.g. CASE). It plays an important role in the development of eGovernment on both national and international level. The center provides advice on change-management issues of knowledge-intensive legal processes and the improvement of knowledge-productivity in legal organisations.

The Leibniz Center for Law has participated in many national and international projects for applied research, in which companies, governments and universities cooperate (cf. ESTRELLA, TRIAS, FEED, CLIME, E-POWER, eCOURT, Legal Services Counter, openlaws.eu, IMPACT). It is the initiator of the MetaLex initiative (http://www.metalex.eu), an XML interchange-format and standard for legal documents. Furthermore, it is frequently involved in innovative projects within governmental organisations, and conducts contract-research for private parties.

== Legal Knowledge Management ==
This area deals with research into- and the development of methods and techniques for knowledge management in the legal field. Coupled to this research, the provision of education in Legal Knowledge Management. The chair of Legal Knowledge Management is held by Prof. Dr. Tom van Engers

The field of research is multi-disciplinary: Law, computer science, informatics.

The research covers (amongst others):

- The development of knowledge-based techniques such as legal ontologies for the comparison and harmonization of law.
- The automatic generation of domain-ontologies from written sources through the use of NLP-technologies.
- Possibilities for the improvement of accessibility of legal sources for the not legally-educated.
- Using ICT to research the consequences of proposed legal decisions (such as new laws) on micro, macro and meso level.
- The development of tools which enable citizens to preview the consequences of a proposed case.
