= Edwina Rissland =

American computer scientist

Edwina Luane Rissland
- Born: Edwina Luane Rissland
- Other name: Edwina Luane Rissland Michener
- Education: Brown University, Brandeis University, Massachusetts Institute of Technology
- Known for: Research in case-based reasoning and artificial intelligence
- Notable work: Cognitive Science: An Introduction* (co-author)
- Awards: CodeX Prize (2023)
- Scientific career
- Fields: Artificial intelligence, Cognitive science, Law
- Workplaces: University of Massachusetts Amherst
- Thesis: Epistemology, Representation, Understanding and Interactive Exploration of Mathematical Theories (1977)
- Doctoral advisor: Seymour Papert

Edwina Luane Rissland (also published as Edwina Luane Rissland Michener) is a retired American mathematician and computer scientist. Initially focusing on knowledge representation and the philosophy of mathematics, her later research in artificial intelligence included work on case-based reasoning and the applications of AI in legal work. She is a professor emerita in the Manning College of Information & Computer Sciences at the University of Massachusetts Amherst. In her retirement she has worked as a photographer and art curator.

== Education and career ==
Rissland majored in applied mathematics as an undergraduate at Brown University, where her undergraduate studies included a computer science course from Andries van Dam. She graduated in 1969. After a 1970 master's degree at Brandeis University, she completed a Ph.D. in mathematics at the Massachusetts Institute of Technology in 1977. Her dissertation, Epistemology, Representation, Understanding and Interactive Exploration of Mathematical Theories, was supervised by Seymour Papert.

She joined the UMass Amherst faculty in 1979. Her interest in law began around this time after reading a book on US Supreme Court decisions. In 1982 and 1983 she was affiliated with the Harvard Law School as a Fellow of Law and Computer Science, and from 1985 to 1986 she returned to the Harvard Law School as a lecturer. She also served two terms as a program director for artificial intelligence and cognitive science at the National Science Foundation, from 2003 to 2007 and again from 2010 to 2012, helped found the International Association for Artificial Intelligence and Law, and later served as its president. She retired in 2013.

== Recognition ==
Rissland was named a Fellow of the Association for the Advancement of Artificial Intelligence in 1991.

In 2023 she received the CodeX prize of the Stanford Center for Legal Informatics for her contributions to computational law, together with her doctoral student, Kevin Ashley, and in particular for their HYPO CBR system for legal case-based reasoning.

== Selected publications ==
Rissland is a coauthor of the textbook Cognitive Science: An Introduction (MIT Press, 1988; 2nd ed., 1995). Her research publications include:

- Michener, Edwina Rissland (October 1978), "Understanding understanding mathematics", Cognitive Science, 2 (4): 361–383, doi:10.1207/s15516709cog0204_3, hdl:1721.1/5735
- Rissland, Edwina L. (1983), "Examples in legal reasoning: Legal hypotheticals" (PDF), in Bundy, Alan (ed.), Proceedings of the 8th International Joint Conference on Artificial Intelligence. Karlsruhe, FRG, August 1983, William Kaufmann, pp. 90–93
- Rissland, Edwina L.; Ashley, Kevin D. (1987), "A case-based system for trade secrets law", Proceedings of the First International Conference on Artificial Intelligence and Law, ICAIL '87, Boston, MA, USA, May 27–29, 1987, ACM, pp. 60–66, doi:10.1145/41735.41743, ISBN 0-89791-230-6
- Rissland, Edwina L. (1990), "Artificial intelligence and law: Stepping stones to a model of legal reasoning", The Yale Law Journal, 99 (8): 1957–1981, doi:10.2307/796679, hdl:20.500.13051/16697, JSTOR 796679
- Rissland, Edwina L.; Skalak, David B. (1991), "CABARET: Rule interpretation in a hybrid architecture", International Journal of Man-Machine Studies, 34 (6): 839–887, doi:10.1016/0020-7373(91)90013-W
- Skalak, David B.; Rissland, Edwina L. (1992), "Arguments and cases: An inevitable intertwining", Artificial Intelligence and Law, 1 (1): 3–44, doi:10.1007/BF00118477
- Rissland, Edwina L.; Ashley, Kevin D.; Branting, Karl (2005), "Case-based reasoning and law", The Knowledge Engineering Review, 20 (3): 293–298, doi:10.1017/S0269888906000701
