= CaseMap =

CaseMap Cloud is a cloud-based relational database software designed to allow law offices to organise evidence.

== Background ==
Launched in 1998 as CaseMap, the software was originally written as a Microsoft Access application by an attorney in Florida, who sought to better manage the facts in his cases. It includes database tables (the program's documentation refers to them as spreadsheets) for facts, issues, documents, physical evidence, depositions, pleadings, persons, organizations, places, and other types of the data. The program's documentation refers to these types of data as objects. Using the program involves linking the various sources of evidence (e.g., documents, depositions, and persons) to facts that are relevant in the case, and to the issues to be decided in the case. The facts table can be sorted by date to provide a chronology of the facts.

The use of large volumes of digital evidence and e-discovery in modern litigation has led law offices to increase their use of litigation support programs such as CaseMap.

CaseMap is owned by LexisNexis. The current version is CaseMap Cloud.

Prior to being purchased by LexisNexis, CaseMap was produced by CaseSoft. For a period in the mid 2000s, CaseMap was part of a larger case management solution set referred to as "Best of Breed". The group included CaseMap, Concordance, Synge and Ipro as part of a suite of products for managing litigation document review and fact management.

== See also ==
- LexisNexis
