= Pro Bono Net =

US non profit organization

Scale Justice (formerly Pro Bono Net) is a US nonprofit organization based in New York City and San Francisco. The organization works in close partnership with nonprofit legal aid organizations across the United States and Canada, to increase access to justice for the millions of poor people who face legal problems every year without help from a lawyer. It does this by (i) supporting the innovative and effective use of technology by the nonprofit legal sector, (ii) increasing participation by volunteers, and (iii) facilitating collaborations among nonprofit legal organizations and advocates working on similar issues or in the same region. Founded in 1998 with a grant from the Open Society Institute, Scale Justice has developed a broad base of support from foundations, law firms, corporate sponsors and nonprofit partners alike, to build web platforms that offer powerful and sophisticated online tools to pro bono and legal aid advocates, and to provide critical legal information and assistance directly to the public. Its model has been adopted in 30 states and regions, reaching approximately two-thirds of the poverty population and lawyers in the United States.

== Partner programs ==
Scale Justice has partnered with nonprofit legal organizations across the U.S. to develop and maintain its programs:

=== Probono.net ===
Probono.net is a national, online resource for legal aid and pro bono attorneys, law professors and students, and related social services advocates. The site promotes collaboration and makes it easier for pro bono attorneys to get involved, saving them time and connecting them with opportunities, training events, mentors, and searchable libraries of practice resources they won't find anywhere else. The site is organized by topical "practice areas" and geographic regions, built and maintained by public interest legal organizations and law firms throughout the country. Members include more than 50,000 advocates from hundreds of public interest organizations and private firms. The prototype of the probono.net site was launched in March 1999, with two practice areas in New York City.

=== LawHelp.org ===
LawHelp is an online resource that helps low and moderate-income people find free legal aid programs in their communities, answers to questions about their legal rights, court information, links to social service agencies, and more. This resource was built and is maintained in partnership with hundreds of legal aid, pro bono and court-based programs across the country. LawHelp.org was recognized with the 2007 Webby Award for Best Law site and nominated for the 2008 Webby Award in the same category. The first LawHelp site designed to serve the information needs of the public was launched in New York City in April 2001.

=== LawHelp Interactive ===
Scale Justice leads a national, centralized effort to provide online legal document assembly for poverty law and court access to justice programs across the country. This site allows subject matter experts to create interview templates that can be used to assemble court forms and other legal documents in PDF or Rich Text Format based on a user's input. The LawHelp Interactive system increases opportunities for self-represented litigants to achieve justice on their own and improves efficiency for legal aid, pro bono and courts-based access to justice programs. This project is in collaboration with Ohio State Legal Services Association, with funding by the Legal Services Corporation, and using HotDocs software donated by LexisNexis.

=== Pro Bono Manager ===
With the support of the Bill & Melinda Gates Foundation, Scale Justice has developed a hosted web application to increase the law firms' pro bono program management capacity. Functioning as an extension of a firm's intranet, the platform integrates information on training events, volunteer opportunities, and legal news from the public-interest legal community with reporting knowledge management and lawyer matching tools that draw on data from the law firm's internal personnel, billing, time keeping and docketing systems. Pro Bono Manager is being used by leading large law firms and is available as a subscription service.
