= Vizlegal =

Irish legal software company

- Company type: Platform
- Industry: Law
- Founded: 2015
- Founder: Gavin Sheridan and José Alberto Suárez López
- Headquarters: Dublin, Ireland
- Area served: Ireland and the UK
- Website: www.vizlegal.com

Vizlegal is a platform that provides lawyers and legal professionals access to verified legal information with court decisions and case tracking. It contains over 4.7 million decisions and cases from Irish, UK and US judicial bodies.

== History ==
Vizlegal was founded by Gavin Sheridan and José Alberto Suárez López in 2015 to provide verified legal information for legal professionals. The platform is known for its user-centered approach and advanced built-in features for searching within legal cases. The company was self-funded, with the addition of being part of an accelerator program in Dublin, Ireland, called NDRC.

In November 2019, Vizlegal announced that it is available to the Bar of Ireland, providing its search and tracking tools to all 2,200 members and staff. In 2020, the company received funding from the EU's Horizon 2020 program.

The company participates in lawyer events, such as Legal Tech Conference, Legal Tech and the Rule of Law, and received the British and Irish Association of Law Librarians (BIALL) Supplier of the Year Award in 2023.

== Features ==
Vizlegal contains over 4.7 million decisions and cases from Irish, EU, US and UK judicial bodies. The platform provides the only database of all Irish planning applications and offers extensive coverage of Irish and British tribunals. The platform allows users to search and organize legal documents by citation, title, or case IDs, and set up notifications for significant changes in Irish, EU, ECHR or English Court cases. The platform also uses AI to summarise decisions and also provides valuable litigation data for lawyers.

== See also ==
- Legal Bill Review
