= Jurimetrics (journal) =

- Language: English

Publication details
- Former name: Modern Uses of Logic in Law
- History: 1959-present
- Publisher: Sandra Day O'Connor College of Law (United States)
- Frequency: Quarterly

Standard abbreviations
- ISO 4: Jurimetrics

Indexing
- ISSN: 0897-1277

Links
- Journal homepage

Jurimetrics, The Journal of Law, Science, and Technology, is a peer-reviewed academic journal published quarterly. It is the official journal of the American Bar Association's Section of Science & Technology Law and the Center for Law, Science & Innovation at the Sandra Day O'Connor College of Law. From 1959 until 1966, the journal was known as Modern Uses of Logic in Law.

== See also ==
- List of law journals
