= OpenGov Foundation =

US nonprofit organization

The OpenGov Foundation
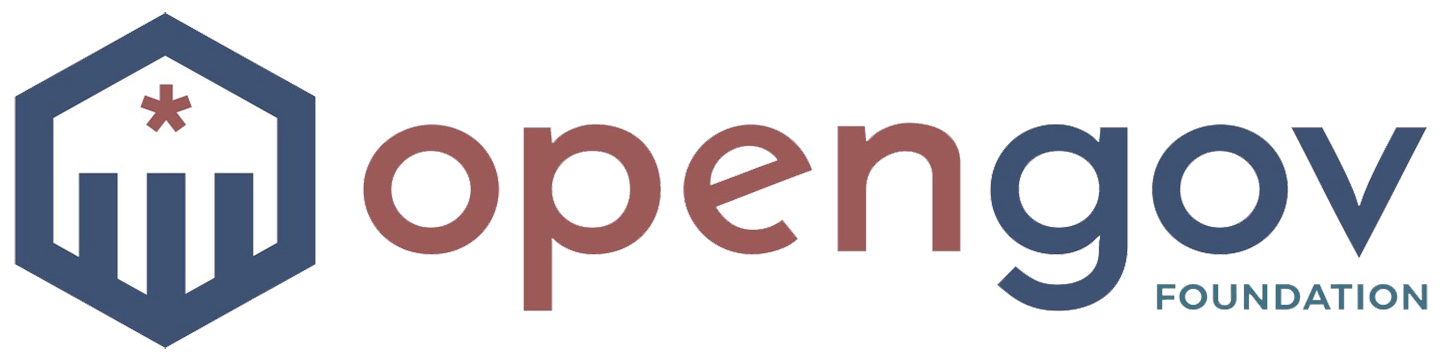
- Founded: June 2012
- Founder: Seamus Kraft and Darrell Issa
- Type: 501(c)(3)
- Purpose: Civic engagement software development for government.
- Location: Washington, D.C., United States
- Origins: The United States Congress
- Region served: United States of America
- Products: Article One, User-Centered Research in Legislatures
- Revenue: $665,723 (2015)
- Expenses: $517,607 (2015)
- Website: opengovfoundation.org

The OpenGov Foundation is a United States nonpartisan, nonprofit organization. It conducts research on legislatures like the United States Congress, develops software for government officials, and claims to help governments create policies and rules that support openness and effective engagement with the public.

The organization was co-founded by Seamus Kraft and Congressman Darrell Issa in 2012, and it is currently funded primarily by the Democracy Fund, Twilio.org, Todd Park and Matt Cutts. In the past, The OpenGov Foundation has been funded by the Knight Foundation, Shuttleworth Foundation, the Rita Allen Foundation and the Consumer Technology Association. The organization is based in Washington, D.C., and has offices in Philadelphia, Pennsylvania, and Wichita, Kansas.

The OpenGov Foundation grew out of the 2011–2012 protests against SOPA and PIPA, creating a platform called Madison that allowed the public to directly and effectively engage alongside Members of Congress in the legislative process. It received a $200,000 grant from the Knight Foundation in 2013, an additional $750,000 from Knight in 2014, and over $700,000 from the Shuttleworth Foundation since 2014. In 2017, The OpenGov Foundation received $150,000 from the Twilio.org Impact Fund and $100,000 from Todd Park.

In May 2017, The OpenGov Foundation released the fourth and last version of the Madison open source legislative engagement software. In June 2017, it began development of Article One, a cloud-based voice and SMS tool that supports meaningful engagement at scale between citizens and their Members of Congress.

== Current Projects ==
=== Article One ===
In May 2017, Twilio.org's Impact Fund awarded The OpenGov Foundation $150,000 to support the development of the Article One prototype. In June 2017, The OpenGov Foundation began in the U.S. Congress the development of Article One, a cloud-based communications tool that efficiently connects citizens and those who serve on their behalf in government.

Article One leverages Twilio, Google Speech and Amazon Web Services to translate constituent communications into understandable, useful and actionable information for elected officials and government staff. The product is designed to help government better handle the skyrocketing volume of constituent telephone calls and other forms of communications, more effectively hear what their constituents are saying, and become more responsive to those they represent.

Article One integrates directly with existing government communications infrastructure and constituent management software; for example, in the U.S. Congress Article One is integrated directly with constituent management system software provided by Fireside21 and Intranet Quorum. In February 2017, GovTech.com reported that seven Members of Congress were using Article One to better engage with their constituents.

The OpenGov Foundation publicly demonstrated Article One to the Third Congressional Hackathon organized by Congressman Steny Hoyer and Congressman Kevin McCarthy in November 2017. This was the first public product demo of Article One, which C-SPAN's "The Communicators" featured on May 20, 2018.

In May 2018, The OpenGov Foundation and U.S. Congressman Rick Crawford launched an SMS-based engagement prototype as the second feature of Article One.

=== User-Centered Research: "From Voicemails to Votes" ===
During 2017, The OpenGov Foundation conducted the first-ever user-centered research on the United States Congress, publishing its findings and data under an open license as "From Voicemails to Votes." To conduct the research, a team of four researchers embedded in 20 Congressional offices for four months, shadowing 58 staffers in both Washington, D.C., and district offices. According to Wired, the research "shows that despite how fractured Congress appears, constituent outreach really can work."

"From Voicemails to Votes" focuses on answering three core questions about Congressional operations and constituent communications. First, how do Congressional teams manage the process and operations of constituent engagement? Second, how does constituent input shape actions and decisions made by Members of Congress and their staff? And third, what capacity do Congressional teams have for change?

In "From Voicemails to Votes," The OpenGov Foundation published user stories for every role in a Congressional office, assessed technologies and mapped workflows currently in use for communicating with constituents, and put forward actionable recommendations to improve the efficiency, responsiveness and satisfaction of constituent engagement operations on Capitol Hill.

=== The Congressional Digital Service ===
During 2015 and 2016, The OpenGov Foundation developed the plan for the Congressional Digital Service (CDS) "to enable a more responsive and open Congress" with modern technology, design thinking and data science. The Democracy Fund supported the development of the CDS plan with a $175,000 grant. In 2017, House Majority Leader Kevin McCarthy and House Democratic Whip Steny Hoyer drafted legislation to adopt The OpenGov Foundation's plan and create the CDS within the U.S. Library of Congress. As of May 2018, The Congressional Digital Service Act is awaiting formal introduction.

CDS was inspired by two things. First, the successes of the government digital services teams founded under President Barack Obama—the United States Digital Service and 18F—which pioneered public sector adoption of modern product and service design practices. Second, a nationwide series of Congressionally focused hackathons co-organized by The OpenGov Foundation and the Harvard Kennedy School's Ash Center for Democratic Governance and Innovation--#Hack4Congress—demonstrated both growing interest for public service within the tech sector and the demand for better digital services within the U.S. Congress.

The OpenGov Foundation's Executive Director Seamus Kraft has spoken widely on the need for CDS. At a March 13, 2017, event at the U.S. National Archives and Records Administration, Kraft underscored the need for the CDS, saying, "Congress has been in the middle of a slow-motion Healthcare.gov crisis for decades. We have a Congress that is struggling with tech and the Internet age."

== People ==
=== Staff ===
The OpenGov Foundation's full-time staff includes Executive Director Seamus Kraft, Deputy Executive Director Patrick Bateman, Director of Product Aaron Ogle, Senior Engineer Tanner Doshier, and Senior Engineer Seth Etter.

The OpenGov Foundation's contract staff includes: Mollie Ruskin, Esther Kang, Hanya Moharram and Meag Doherty.

=== Board of directors ===
The OpenGov Foundation Board of Directors for 2017–2018 includes: Phaedra Chrousos (Chair), Laurent Crenshaw (Vice-Chair), Rich Hirshberg (Treasurer), Seamus Kraft (Secretary), Michelle Lee (Director) and Aaron Snow (Director).

The OpenGov Foundation Board of Directors for 2012–2016 included: Congressman Darrell Issa (Chair Emeritus), Seamus Kraft (Vice-Chair), Chris Birk (Director), Abhi Nemani (Director), Lanham Napier (Director), the Honorable Tom Davis (Director), Lawrence Brady (Director) and James Lacy.

=== Board of Advisors ===
In addition to a Board of Directors, The OpenGov Foundation has established a Board of Advisors to provide issue-specific expertise to the staff and Board of Directors. The OpenGov Foundation's 2017–2018 Board of Advisors includes: Dr. Anne Washington, Brandon Andrews, Jo-Marie St. Martin, Scout Addis, Karien Bezuidenhout, Janine Gianfredi, Peter Karman and Bob Sofman.

== Awards & Recognitions ==
In 2012, TechCrunch named The OpenGov Foundation co-founder and Executive Director Seamus Kraft one of "The 20 Most Innovative People in Democracy" for his efforts creating the Madison policymaking platform. Other awardees included President Barack Obama, U.S. Senator Cory Booker, Mayor Michael Bloomberg, Google's Eric Schmidt and President of Estonia Toomas Hendrick Ilves.

In 2016, the American Library Association awarded The OpenGov Foundation team and Executive Director Seamus Kraft its highest honor, the James Madison Award, which is given annually "to honor individuals or groups who have championed, protected and promoted public access to government information and the public’s right to know at the national level." Other recipients of the award include U.S. Senator John Tester, U.S. Senator John Cornyn, Aaron Swartz and U.S. Congresswoman Zoe Lofgren.

The Washington, DC Legal Hackers have twice awarded The OpenGov Foundation a "Le Hackie." In 2014, the Le Hackie was for "Organization of the Year" for spearheading the nationwide Free Law Founders movement. In 2018, the Le Hackie was for conducting and publishing the first-ever user-centered research done on the United States Congress, "From Voicemails to Votes."

== Past Projects ==
=== Madison ===
Madison is a government policy co-creation platform that opens up laws and legislation. Issa's congressional team launched Project Madison in December 2011 to support opposition to SOPA and PIPA in the U.S. Congress. A group of U.S. representatives and senators used Madison to develop alternative legislation, the Online Protection and Enforcement of Digital Trade Act.

Fast Company described the Madison beta version as "a stripped-down interactive blogging platform, which allows citizens to select individual passages of legislation, and strike or add their own language, with comments for each suggestion. Citizens are encouraged to like or dislike each change, with the most popular suggestions rising to the top."

Madison has since grown and been adopted by governments across the country and globe, including Washington, D.C., the federal government of Mexico, and the United Nations. In February 2015, The White House used Madison to crowdsource its Public Participation Playbook.

In 2016, Bloomberg Philanthropies "What Works Cities" program and the Sunlight Foundation began using Madison to develop municipal open data policies in the initiative's member cities, including Buffalo, New York, Syracuse, New York, Memphis, Tennessee, Nashville, Tennessee and Arlington, Texas.

In May 2017, The OpenGov Foundation released Madison 4.0 as open source software and ceased active development of the platform.

=== Open Source Software and Open Data in Government ===
The OpenGov Foundation has provided expert guidance to policymakers and staff on the use of open source software and open data at all levels of government in the United States.

At the national level, The OpenGov Foundation spearheaded successful efforts in 2015 to allow Members of Congress to both use open source software and actively participate in open source software development. In a Huffington Post interview on the impact of the ruling, U.S. Congressman Jared Polis said, "By taking advantage of the newest technology and collaborating with the open source community, we can improve everything from the accessibility of congressional websites to the efficiency of business on the House floor. Personally, I can’t wait to begin integrating open source technology into my office’s daily operations.”

At the local level, The OpenGov Foundation and the Free Law Founders coalition, which it co-founded in 2013 and continues to co-lead, have achieved two major victories advancing the public's access to the public laws in open data formats. In 2014, the City of San Francisco, California, at the urging of then-Supervisor Mark Farrell, became the first city in the United States to adopt an open legal data framework for local laws. During the same year, the City of New York, New York became the first city in the United States to formally require its laws and legal codes be published in open data formats. New York City Council Member Ben Kallos drafted the "Law Online Act," which New York City Mayor Bill de Blasio signed into law in August 2014.

=== The State Decoded ===
The State Decoded is an open source platform that displays legal codes, court decisions, and information from legislative tracking services to make it all more understandable. It was originally created by Waldo Jaquith for the Commonwealth of Virginia. The OpenGov Foundation subsequently launched a version for the state of Maryland in May 2013 and followed with Baltimore, Maryland, launched with the Baltimore Mayor's Office in July 2013. It has since launched in a total of eight city and state governments across the country, including San Francisco, Chicago, Florida, and Washington, D.C.

=== Hack4Congress ===
In early 2015, The OpenGov Foundation partnered with the Ash Center for Democratic Governance and Innovation to organize a series of civic hackathons across the country, dubbed "Hack4Congress." The events, held in Cambridge, San Francisco, and Washington, D.C., drew hundreds of participants, including over a dozen Members of Congress, to build open source software prototypes to make Congress more efficient.

=== Work in Maryland ===
The OpenGov Foundation has worked in Maryland and its largest municipality, Baltimore, to custom develop software and data sets that increase government transparency, help citizens participate in their state and city governments, and hold them accountable. The Baltimore Sun described OpenGov's work as a "test case for trying to make state and local government more transparent and participatory using technology."

The OpenGov Foundation's work in Maryland is funded by a grant awarded in 2013 by the Knight Foundation.

=== Work in Chicago ===
In March 2015, The OpenGov Foundation partnered with the City of Chicago to launch ChicagoCode.org, a product of The State Decoded, to make the city's laws and regulations more accessible to citizens.

In March 2016, then-Chicago City Clerk Susana Mendoza and The OpenGov Foundation launched Envision Chicago, a scholarship contest in which Chicago high school students found city laws of interest to them using ChicagoCode.org and then proposed improvements to the law to their city officials. Four students won $1,000 scholarships through Envision Chicago. In addition to then-Clerk Mendoza, Alderman Ameya Pawar, Alderman Roberto Maldonado, Alderman Carrie Austin and Alderman Anthony Napolitano participated in the initiative.

On July 20, 2016, the Chicago City Council passed legislation celebrating Envision Chicago and recognizing The OpenGov Foundation and all participating students. In remarks to the City Council, Chicago Mayor Rahm Emanuel highlighted the importance of the initiative and the impact of The OpenGov Foundation's work with the City Council and community at large.
