= List of Minnesota State University, Mankato people =

This is a list of notable people associated with Minnesota State University, Mankato.

== Alumni ==
=== Academics and education ===
Name	Notability	Reference(s)
Barbara Fister	Librarian, professor at Gustavus Adolphus College	
Steve Gehrke	Professor of fine arts at University of Texas-Austin, poet	
Judith Kuster	Professor of speech-language pathology	
Michelle LaRue	Conservation biologist and ecologist	
Shirley Ardell Mason	Art teacher, subject of 1973 book Sybil	
Nancy B. Olson	Librarian and educator; founder, Online Audiovisual Catalogers (OLAC)	
William A. Sederburg	Senior scholar, American Association of State Colleges and Universities; former president, Utah Valley University	
Gwen Walz	Educator, public school administrator, and 39th First Lady of Minnesota	
Suzanne White	Professor at community college and debate coach	
Yang Chao-hsiang	President, Fo Guang University; former Minister of Examination and Minister of Education of Taiwan	
Dean Zimmerman	Professor of philosophy at Rutgers University	

=== Arts and entertainment ===
Name	Notability	Reference(s)
Adrienne Armstrong	Record producer, clothing designer, and wife of Billie Joe Armstrong of the band Green Day	
Barbara Fister	Author, blogger and librarian	
Becca Kufrin	Winner of the twenty-second season of The Bachelor and the lead on the fourteenth season of The Bachelorette	
Andrew Kuster	Writer, composer, and conductor	
Josh Liljenquist	Social media personality and philanthropist	
Myron Medcalf	Senior College Basketball Writer at ESPN, Radio Host	
Vicki Myron	Librarian, author of Dewey: The Small-Town Library Cat Who Touched the World	
Brad Nessler	Sports commentator, ESPN/ESPN on ABC	
Melissa Peterman	Actress, Reba	
Rob Shanahan	Rock & roll photographer, Ringo Starr's personal photographer	
Mona Smith	Native American artist, storyteller, and documentary producer	
Mark Withers	Actor, Dynasty	
Cedric Yarbrough	Actor, Reno 911! and The Boondocks	

=== Athletics ===
Name	Notability	Reference(s)
David Backes	Professional and Olympic hockey player	
Adrian Battles	Professional football player	
Kevin Birr	Curler, USCA bronze medalist	
Teddy Blueger	Latvian professional hockey player	
Jerilyn Britz	Professional golfer, Minnesota State Mavericks Athletics Hall of Fame	
LaMark Brown	Professional football player	
Larry Brown	Professional football player	
Ryan Carter	Former professional hockey player	
John Castañeda	UFC bantamweight mixed martial artist	
Jim Dilling	High jumper, 2007 USA Outdoor Champion	
Aaron Fox	Professional hockey coach and former player	
Brandon Girtz	2007 NCAA All-American wrestler, Bellator mixed martial artist	
Randall Herbst	Head men's basketball coach for the Minot State Beavers	
Tim Jackman	Professional hockey player	
Jon Kalinski	Professional hockey player	
Connor Mackey	Professional hockey player	
Emmanuel Matadi	2016 Olympic 100m and 200m sprinter, flag bearer for Liberia in the 2016 Parade of Nations	
Dryden McKay	Professional hockey goaltender	
Travis Morin	Professional hockey player and American Hockey League MVP	
Joel Nielsen	Sports administrator	
Zach Palmquist	Professional hockey player	
Malavath Purna	Indian mountaineer, youngest Indian and youngest female to scale Mount Everest	
Chris Reed	Professional football player	
Grant Stevenson	Professional hockey player	
C.J. Suess	Professional hockey player	
Adam Thielen	Professional football player	
Darren Tighe	Head men's basketball coach for the Mary Marauders	
Steven Wagner	Professional hockey player	
Shane Zylstra	Tight end for NFL Detroit Lions	

=== Business and leadership ===
Name	Notability	Reference(s)
Albert T. Annexstad	Former president and CEO, Federated Mutual	
Lou Bellamy	Founder, Penumbra Theatre Company	
Kris Lindahl	Realtor known for large advertisements showing himself with outstretched arms	
Tom J. Shea	Businessman for Shea Company Inc and Steele County, former member of the Minnesota House of Representatives	
Glen Taylor	Founder, Taylor Corporation; owner, Minnesota Timberwolves and Minnesota Lynx	

=== Law, politics, government, and military ===
Name	Notability	Reference(s)
Ben Bakeberg	Member of the Minnesota House of Representatives	
Bob Barrett	Member of the Minnesota House of Representatives; director of market research for the Hazelden Foundation	
Jessica Benham	Member, Pennsylvania House of Representatives	
Bob Bird	Alaskan politician and organizer	
Charnelle Bjelkengren	Judge for Spokane County Superior Court	
David Bly	Member of the Minnesota House of Representatives	
Larry Buendorf	Former Navy aviator and Secret Service agent	
Lyndon Carlson	Politician and former member of the Minnesota House of Representatives	
Pat Garofalo	Politician and former member of the Minnesota House of Representatives	
Theresa Greenfield	Democratic candidate for 2020 U.S. Senate in Iowa	
Lt. Gen. Dennis Hejlik (USMC)	Commanding general of Fleet Marine Force, Atlantic, and Marine Forces Command	
John Jasinski	Member of the Minnesota Senate	
David M. Jennings	Former speaker of the House, Minnesota House of Representatives	
Patrick D. McGowan	Former member of the Minnesota Senate and sheriff of Hennepin County	
Scott Newman	Attorney and former member of the Minnesota Senate and Minnesota House of Representatives	
Brian Pfarr	Former member of the Minnesota House of Representatives	
Mark Piepho	Former member of the Minnesota House of Representatives and Minnesota Senate	
Christian Rosenmeier	Minnesota Senator	
Gary J. Schmidt	Assemblyman, Wisconsin State Assembly	
Stephanie Schriock	Former president, Emily's List; former campaign manager for Senator Al Franken (D-MN)	
Rod Searle	Minnesota state representative and speaker of the House Minnesota House of Representatives	
Roy F. Schulz	Former member of the Minnesota House of Representatives and farmer	
Greg Stevens	Former member of Iowa House of Representatives	
Steve Strachan	Former member of the Minnesota House of Representatives, former sheriff of King County, Washington	
Arthur S. Thomas	Chief of chaplains of the U.S. Air Force	
Mohamed Aden Tiiceey	Founder and former president of unrecognized autonomous state, Himan and Heeb	
Tim Walz	41st governor of Minnesota, 2024 Democratic nominee for vice president of the United States	
Andy Welti	Representative, Minnesota House of Representatives	
Samuel B. Wilson	Former chief justice, Minnesota Supreme Court	
John M. Zwach	Former U.S. representative, MN-06	

=== Other ===
Name	Notability	References
Minnie F. Abrams	Missionary to India; "the most prominent veteran female missionary in the holiness movement who identified with Pentecostalism"	
Jeanne Audrey Powers	Leader I the United Methodist Church, advocate for women and LGBTQ+ people in the church, and one of the first women ordained in the denomination	

== Faculty ==
Name	Notability	Reference(s)
William Artis	Sculptor, professor of ceramics	
David G. Bronner	Businessman, professor of business and finance	
Barbara K. Charbonneau-Dahlen	Pembina Chippewa advocate, professor of nursing	
Harry Coonce	Professor of mathematics	
Terry Davis	Novelist, professor of English	
Cathy Day	Novelist, short-story writer, professor of English	
Eber Hampton	Former president, First Nations University of Canada; professor of psychology	
Todd Hoffner	Head football coach	
Clark Johnson	Former member, Minnesota House of Representatives; professor of social sciences	
Judith Kuster	Professor of speech-language pathology	
Charlotte Lachs	Soprano singer, professor of vocal music	
Agnes Larson	Historian, professor of history	
Frederic Lillebridge	Pianist, composer, professor of instrumental music	
Richard Robbins	Poet, professor of English	
Julia Sears	Academic, suffragist, first woman to head a public college in the United States	
Kathy Sheran	Former member, Minnesota Senate; assistant professor of nursing	
Hafiz Siddiqi	Professor of business management	
Seiji Takaku	Psychologist, professor of psychology	
Richard Terrill	Author, jazz musician, professor of fine arts	
Nancy Wicker	Professor of art history	

== Presidents ==
The following persons have served as president of Minnesota State University, Mankato:

No.	Image	President	Term start	Term end	Refs.
Principals of the Mankato State Normal School (1868–1880)
1		George M. Gage	1868	1872	
2		Julia A. Sears	1872	1873	
3		David C. John	1873	1880	
Principals of the Mankato State Normal School (1880–1921)
4		Edward Searing	1880	1898	
5		Charles H. Cooper	1898	1930	
President of the Mankato State Teachers College (1921–1957)
6		Frank D. McElroy	1930	1946	
7		Clarence L. Crawford	1946	1965	
President of the Mankato State College (1957–1975)
acting		Melvin G. Scarlett	1965	1966	
8		James F. Nickerson	1966	1973	
acting		Kent Alm	1973	1974	
9		Douglas R. Moore	1974	1978	
President of the Mankato State University (1975–1998)
acting		Edward McMahon	1978	1979	
10		Margaret R. Preska	1979	1992	
acting		John B. Davis, Jr.	1992	1992	
11		Richard R. Rush	1992	2001	
President of the Minnesota State University, Mankato (1998–present)
Interim		Karen Boubel	2001	June 30, 2002	
12		Richard Davenport	July 1, 2002	June 30, 2021	
13		Edward Inch	July 1, 2021	present	
