= Janice Merrill-Oldham =

American librarian and conservator (1947–2011)

- Born: May 10, 1947; Milford, Connecticut, US
- Died: October 5, 2011 (aged 64); Cambridge, Massachusetts
- Education: University of Rhode Island (MLS); University of Connecticut (BA)
- Occupation: Preservation librarian
- Years active: 1975–2010

Janice Elaine Merrill-Oldham (May 10, 1947 – October 5, 2011) was an American preservation librarian who was a preeminent figure in the field of library binding and conservation. She served as Malloy-Rabinowitz Preservation Librarian and director of the Weissman Preservation Center at the Harvard Library from 1995 to 2010. She founded and led the University of Connecticut Libraries' Preservation Department from 1983 to 1995.

== Education and career ==
Merrill-Oldham was born Janice "Jan" Merrill in Milford, Connecticut, on May 10, 1947. Her parents were Alice Cecarelli Merrill and James Hersey Merrill. She had one sibling, James Wallace Merrill. She was raised in Milford and spent summers with her grandparents in East Sumner, Maine. She graduated from Jonathan Law High School in 1965 and earned her Bachelor of Arts in English from the University of Connecticut in 1969.

She began her career as a student employee in the Homer D. Babbidge Library. While employed in the Library's binding department, Merrill-Oldham received a National Endowment for the Humanities fellowship at the Yale University Library, where she received six months of formal training in library and archival conservation in 1979. She earned her Master of Library Science (MLS) from the University of Rhode Island in 1984.

She was head of the Preservation Department at the University of Connecticut Libraries in Storrs, Connecticut from 1985-1995 before her appointment as the Malloy-Rabinowitz Preservation Librarian in the Harvard University Library.

== Leadership and awards ==
Merrill-Oldham served in leadership roles in the American Library Association's Preservation & Reformatting Section (PARS), the Association of Research Libraries, and other organizations. PARS established the Jan Merrill-Oldham Professional Development Grant in her honor in 2011. The award "supports professional development and involvement by librarians and paraprofessionals new to the preservation field."

She was an influential advocate for library conservation, building the Harvard Library's conservation operations until she oversaw one hundred staff and the new Weissman Preservation Center. She was interviewed in-depth by the New York Times in 1986.

Merrill-Oldham authored over forty publications. With Paul A. Parisi, she wrote the eighth Library Binding Institute Standard for Library Binding in 1986. It later became the ANSI/NISO/LBI Z39.78-2000 national information standard.

She also coauthored the Guide to the Library Binding Institute Standard for Library Binding (Chicago: American Library Association, 1990).

She received several professional awards. She received the Ross Atkinson Lifetime Achievement Award (2011), the Paul Banks and Carolyn Harris Preservation Award (1994), and the Esther J. Piercy Award (1990) from the Association for Library Collections and Technical Services (ALCTS), a division of the American Library Association.

She received a University of Connecticut Distinguished Service Award (1994) and a special commendation for leadership and service from the Association of Research Libraries (2003).

== Selected publications ==
- Merrill-Oldham, Jan; Smith, Merrily, eds. (1985). The Library Preservation Program: Models, Priorities, Possibilities: Proceedings of a Conference, April 29, 1983, Washington, D.C. Chicago: American Library Association. pp. vii, 117. ISBN 0-8389-3315-7. LCCN 84028270.
- Parisi, Paul A.; Merrill-Oldham, Jan, eds. (1986). Library Binding Institute Standard for Library Binding (8th ed.). Library Binding Institute. p. 17.
- Merrill-Oldham, Jan, ed. (1988). Meeting the Preservation Challenge. Washington, D.C.: Association of Research Libraries. pp. vi, 70. ISBN 0-918006-15-5.
- Merrill-Oldham, Jan; Parisi, Paul A. (1990). Guide to the Library Binding Institute Standard for Library Binding. Chicago: American Library Association. pp. ix, 62. ISBN 0-8389-3391-2.
- Merrill-Oldham, Jan; Morrow, Carolyn Clark; Roosa, Mark (1991). Preservation Program Models: A Study Project and Report. Washington, D.C.: Association of Research Libraries. p. 54. ISBN 0-918006-20-1.
- Merrill-Oldham, Jan; Schrock, Nancy Carlson (2000). "The Conservation of General Collections". In Banks, Paul N.; Pilette, Roberta (eds.). Preservation: Issues and Planning. Chicago: American Library Association. pp. 225–247. ISBN 0-8389-0776-8.
- Merrill-Oldham, Jan (2002). "Taking Care: An Informed Approach to Library Preservation". To Preserve and Protect: The Strategic Stewardship of Cultural Resources. Washington, D.C.: Library of Congress.
- Merrill-Oldham, Jan; Parisi, Paul (2008). Guide to the ANSI/NISO/LBI Library Binding Standard: ANSI/NISO/LBI Z39.78-2000. Chicago: Association for Library Collections & Technical Services, Preservation and Reformatting Section. pp. ix, 63. ISBN 978-0-8389-8484-0.

== Personal life ==
She married Peter Oldham in 1976. In 1978, they changed their surnames to Merrill-Oldham. She died of cancer at home in Cambridge, Massachusetts. She had no issue.

Peter Oldham served as sales and marketing director at Acme Bookbinding for over eighteen years.
