= Nancy B. Olson =

American catalog librarian (1936–2018)

Nancy Grace Butterfield Olson (April 10, 1936 – December 24, 2018) was an American librarian and educator, an expert on cataloging rules for non-print materials, and the founder of the Online Audiovisual Catalogers (OLAC).

== Education and personal life ==
Olson was born April 10, 1936, in Estherville, Iowa, to Stuart and Vivian (Kelly) Butterfield. She died December 24, 2018, in Austin, Minnesota. Nancy married Jean Engebrit Olson in 1956 and had four children together.

She earned a Bachelor of Science degree in chemical technology and education from Iowa State University. Olson earned her Master of Science (Curriculum and Instruction, Library Science) from Mankato State College in 1970 and would earn Education Specialist certificates from Mankato.

Originally a chemist, following a break from her career, rather than return to school for several years to retrain in chemistry, Olson enrolled as a member of the inaugural class of the one-year library science master's program at Mankato State College in 1969/1970. As a chemist, she had become accustomed to using onsite reference collections rather than a traditional library, so using libraries was not a habit for Olson before her library degree program.

== Work ==
=== Career at Minnesota State University, Mankato ===
Hired as a cataloger on the day she graduated with her master's from Mankato State College by Dale Carrison, the director of the institution's library, Olson's responsibility was to catalog all of the library's non-print resources that had never been cataloged. Carrison - who believed strongly that nonprint materials deserved to be treated the same as print materials—successfully persuaded academic departments to transfer various small departmental collections of materials (including non-print materials such as films) to the library. Initially, Olson had to rely on discerning rules of cataloging practice from printed catalog cards issued by the Library of Congress for film and sound recordings, along with guidance from a slender volume of cataloging rules published by the Canadian Library Association. In 1976, Mankato State became a member of OCLC, and Olson converted the catalog cards for non-print resources into MARC. While Carrison was still director, she convinced him that non-print materials should also be classified—just as print materials were—and this necessitated a third time to revisit her earliest catalog records to add class numbers. She served as a non-print cataloger, head of cataloging, and professor over her thirty years at the University Library, Minnesota State University, Mankato until her retirement with the rank of Professor Emerita in 1999.

=== Professional service and teaching ===
Olson was very active in her state library association, serving as president of the Minnesota Library Association (1978–1979). And she was also active with cataloging-related committees in the American Library Association, including serving as the OLAC Liaison to the ALA Committee on Cataloging: Description and Access (CC:DA) from 1981 to 1983. She founded in 1980 the Online Audiovisual Catalogers (OLAC), an international professional association for non-print catalogers. During her career, Olson was instrumental in improving and expanding MARC and cataloging rules for non-print resources.

She was a Visiting Distinguished Scholar at OCLC in 1982–83.

As an expert on non-print cataloging, she was a frequent instructor and workshop leader who taught catalogers about non-print cataloging. Some of Olson's teaching events were long-term associations, including teaching a workshop at the University of Pittsburgh for 15 years and a twice-a-year workshop at San Jose State University for five years. Olson also taught workshops by invitation in many other settings, including OLAC conferences. Her teaching also extended to more general cataloging training, including her founding of, and work with, the Minnesota AACR2 Trainers, a group of librarians who conducted a series of workshops in Minnesota on the then-new AACR2 cataloging rules. Her final workshop was presented at the 2004 OLAC conference in St. Paul, Minnesota.

=== Awards and honors ===
Olson was the 1980 recipient of the Esther J. Piercy Award by the American Library Association's Association for Library Collections & Technical Services (ALCTS) for outstanding contributions to librarianship in the field of technical services.

She received a certificate of merit from the Minnesota Library Association in 1980.

Olson received the OLAC Founder Award in 1986 for her contributions to audiovisual cataloging and her role in founding the Online Audiovisual Catalogers (OLAC). The award was renamed the Nancy B. Olson Award in her honor in 1999.

She was awarded a Faculty Merit Award from Minnesota State University, Mankato in 1989.

Olson received the 1999 Margaret Mann Citation, one of the highest awards in librarianship, from the ALCTS Cataloging and Classification Section for her role in “guiding the evolution and promoting the adoption of standardized cataloging” for audiovisual materials.

==== Author and publisher ====
Olson was the founder and owner of the Soldier Creek Press (Lake Crystal, Minnesota), a publisher of numerous practical guides for catalogers, especially non-print catalogers. Many of the works published by the press were also authored or co-authored by Olson. Beyond the works published by Soldier Creek Press, her writings on cataloging-related topics appeared in library professional journals and books from other publishers.

== Selected publications ==
She wrote numerous publications on cataloging special formats, including: Cataloging of Audiovisual Materials and Other Special Materials: A Manual Based on AACR2 and MARC 21

- Olson, N. B., & American Library Association. (1988). Audiovisual material glossary. Dublin, Ohio: OCLC Online Computer Library Center.
- Olson, N. B., & OCLC. (1997). Cataloging Internet resources: A manual and practical guide. Dublin, Ohio: OCLC.
- The combined indexes to the Library of Congress classification schedules (1974-1975), compiled by Nancy B. Olson.
- A manual of AACR 2 examples for motion pictures and videorecordings (1981), by Jean Aichele and Nancy B. Olson, edited by Marilyn H. McClaskey and Edward Swanson.
- Cataloging of audiovisual materials: a manual based on AACR 2 (1981), by Nancy B. Olson.
- Index to the Library of Congress Cataloging service bulletin (1945-1978), compiled by Nancy B. Olson.
- Cataloging microcomputer software: a manual to accompany AACR 2, chapter 9, Computer files (1988), by Nancy B. Olson.
- The Butterfield family history and recipe book (1989), compiled and edited by Sharon Olson and Susan Olson; family history compiled by Nancy B. Olson.
- Cataloging motion pictures and videorecordings (1991), by Nancy B. Olson; edited by Edward Swanson.
- Cataloging Service Bulletin Index (1978-1992), compiled by Nancy B. Olson .
