= Casa de Shenandoah =

House in Las Vegas, Nevada

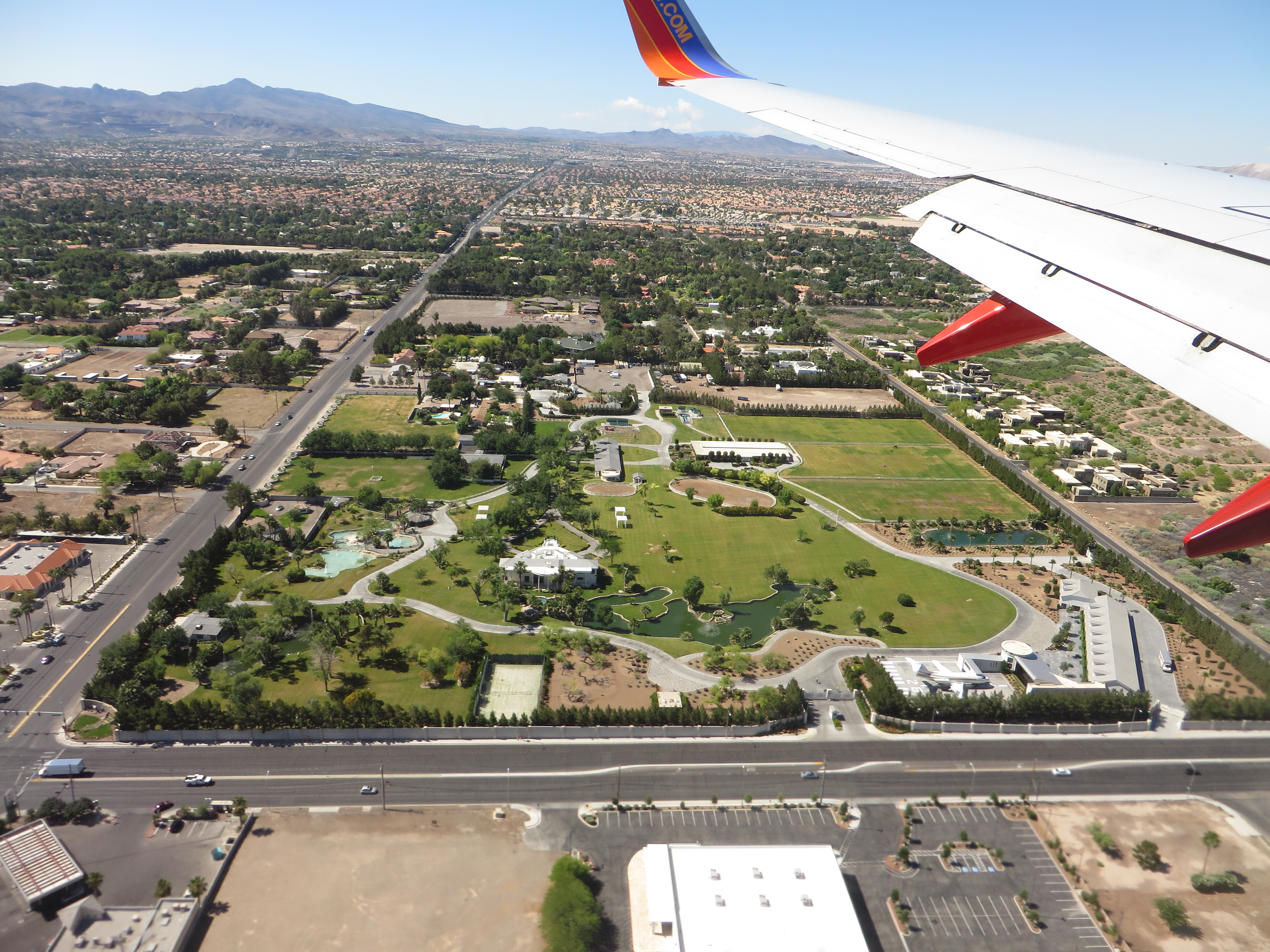
- Aerial view of Casa de Shenandoah in May 2015
- Former names: Sunset Springs Ranch (2013–2014)

General information
- Location: 3310 East Sunset Road, Paradise, Nevada, United States
- Coordinates: 36.070530°N 115.102457°W
- Completed: 1978 (main house)
- Opened: September 18, 2015
- Renovated: 2013, 2015
- Closed: April 24, 2018
- Owner: Smoketree LLC

Technical details
- Floor area: 14,000 sq ft (1,300 m^{2}) (main house)
- Grounds: 39.5 acres (16.0 ha)

Casa de Shenandoah is the former estate of the singer Wayne Newton who used the property as a ranch for various animals. It is located on 39.5 acres (16.0 ha) in Paradise, Nevada, in the Las Vegas Valley. Newton initially purchased five vacant acres of the property in 1966 and gradually expanded it with several houses, including a mansion completed in 1978.

In 2010, Newton proposed turning the estate into a public attraction, an idea that received opposition from nearby residents who had concerns about the traffic that such a project would bring. His proposal was approved by county officials, but was delayed in 2012 when his business partner on the project, CSD LLC, filed a lawsuit against him alleging that he and his family had interfered in the development plans.

After legal issues were resolved, the property was put up for sale in 2013 and again in 2014. The estate ultimately opened as a public attraction on September 18, 2015, with Newton's involvement. It closed for renovations on April 24, 2018. Newton said the property would reopen to the public, although he and his wife subsequently withdrew the permits for the attraction in July 2018. It was sold in 2019 to Smoketree LLC, which put it up for sale a year later.

== History ==
Singer Wayne Newton initially purchased five acres of the site in 1966. The site was vacant at the time. As of 1967, the Casa de Shenandoah ranch included a stable and riding corral. Newton, his parents, and his brother and sister-in-law lived in a guest house on the ranch, while a main house was in the planning stage. Newton had ten horses living on the ranch, as well as a pack of dogs. Newton's wife, Elaine, would also live at the ranch following the couple's marriage in 1968. At the time, the ranch included a Learjet plane on the site. Additional acreage was acquired between 1969 and 1972. The ranch would ultimately consist of 39.5 acres (16.0 ha).

As of 1970, Newton had an Arabian horse-breeding stable on the ranch. Newton would later breed his Arabian horses at a separate ranch elsewhere in Nevada, where the remainder of his horses would be kept. By 1973, the ranch had three houses and a horse hospital. As of 1976, Casa de Shenandoah was home to 120 Arabian horses. The ranch would later include a heliport and a dozen automobiles in various garages located on the estate. Newton's on-site automobile collection included Rolls-Royces, and a 1929 Duesenberg that once belonged to Howard Hughes, a former boss of Newton. In addition, Casa de Shenandoah has artesian wells and lakes.

As of 1976, work was underway on a new house for the ranch. At the time, Newton and his wife lived in a six-bedroom ranch house on the property, and his parents lived in a separate house, also on the land. As of 1978, construction was nearing completion on a $4 million southern-style mansion on the site. The mansion was designed by Newton, who denied that it was meant as a replica of the Tara plantation featured in Gone with the Wind. After the mansion's completion, Newton's then-wife decorated each room of the building except for his office, known as the Red Room, where Newton conducted media interviews. The room featured red velvet walls, and contained Newton's various plaques and awards, as well as memorabilia.

As of 1979, Newton and his parents lived on the ranch along with approximately 70 servants and aides. By that time, Newton also had various animals freely roaming on the property, including deer, dogs, ducks, swans, and wallabies, as well as peacocks which frequented the property's lakes. Newton's eventual spokeswoman and sister-in-law, Tricia McCrone, said, "People have actually dropped their animals over the wall, hearing it's an animal sanctuary — especially bunnies after Easter."

U.S. President Ronald Reagan attended a political fundraiser at the ranch in 1982. At the time, the ranch had eight separate homes, including the mansion. Newton married Kathleen McCrone at the estate in April 1994. Newton also hosted private weddings there.

In August 2000, a brush fire at the nearby Sunset Park went over a 10-foot wall and onto Newton's property, burning an acre of land. Animals on the property were moved to safety by the staff, and Newton's collection of vintage Rolls-Royce vehicles were driven away from the garage to a secure part of the property. The fire on Newton's property was quickly extinguished, although embers on the land reignited twice later in the night. Newton and his family were in Boston at the time for one of his performances.

In 2008, CBS News named Casa de Shenandoah as one of the top five homes in the country, while MTV Cribs called it one of the top three "priciest pads".

Bruton Smith, a former friend of Newton's, filed a lawsuit against him in February 2010, alleging that Newton owed $3.3 million on a loan. Smith sought to foreclose on Casa de Shenandoah, but the case was voluntarily dismissed later that year. Subsequently, a complaint was filed against Newton's recent storage of his Fokker F-28 jet plane on the property.

=== Attraction ===
In June 2010, CSD LLC purchased the estate for $18.7 million, along with ten additional acres across the street for an additional $10 million. Lacy and Dorothy Harber, residents of Texas, were majority owners of CSD, while the Newtons became 20 percent partners in the company. Steve Kennedy and his ex-girlfriend/business partner Geneva Clark split the remaining 10 percent of company ownership. CSD and the Newtons had plans to open Casa de Shenandoah as a public attraction with tours going through the property. Newton said that "a lot of people have written and want to see what the property looks like, and my wife said that if you have something so special, it should be shared." The partnership agreement between CSD and the Newtons ranked among the largest Las Vegas real estate deals of the decade. Prior to signing the deal with CSD, Newton had already filmed hundreds of hours of commentary about his various memorabilia. Since May 2010, Newton's friend Rudy Ruettiger had been involved in shooting a documentary on the ranch's transformation into an attraction.

CSD became the landlord of the Newtons, charging a lease fee of $1 per month until the completion of a new house on the property for the Newtons to live in. CSD agreed to pay $2 million to build the new home, which would not be part of the public attraction. The private home would be built on the back of the property, and Newton and his family would live there while tours were being given of the main house, which contained 14,000 sq ft (1,300 m^{2}).

The plans for Casa de Shenandoah were announced in September 2010. Tours would include Newton's garage of automobiles and his Fokker jet, while shuttle tours of the ranch would feature Newton's zoo of animals, including African penguins, peacocks, and more than 70 Arabian horses. In addition to tours, the project would include a dinner theater, museum, and a gift shop, all of which would be located on the ten acres. The museum would be a larger version of the Red Room, and would include items from Newton's career and from other entertainers affiliated with Las Vegas. Newton described it as a hall of fame for people such as Frank Sinatra, Dean Martin, and Sammy Davis Jr. Newton said entertainers would be added to the hall of fame each year, and mentioned the possibility of a television special focusing on it. The 600-seat theater would be designed like Newton's favorite showroom, the Copa Room at the Sands Hotel and Casino. Newton would be the primary headliner. The museum and theater would be located in a vacant building that previously operated as the Napa Valley Pottery and Floral store.

A neighborhood meeting on the project was held later in September 2010. A film crew from Ruettiger's production company attended the meeting, where the project received unanimous opposition from nearby residents. Newton's home was located in a neighborhood designated for rural preservation, and residents expressed concern about shuttle bus traffic for the new project, although the site of the proposed museum and theater was already zoned for commercial use, and Newton's home would only require a special-use permit for tours.

In October 2010, Kennedy and CSD filed a lawsuit against M.J. Harvey, a longtime Paradise township activist, alleging that she repeatedly made false statements about how the project could affect homeowners and nearby communities. The lawsuit alleged that Harvey did so "with the intent of denying the project the necessary community endorsements." Later that month, the Paradise Town Advisory Board recommended against the project, citing concerns about tourism and heavy traffic in the rural area. The board also recommended against a proposal by Newton to privatize Tomiyasu Lane, located along the west side of Casa de Shenandoah, in an effort to contain traffic. Newton stated he would pay for the road proposal, although residents along Tomiyasu opposed the idea. CSD planned to build the museum regardless of neighborhood opposition. The project would create 400 jobs. According to Newton, opponents of the project referred to it as "Graceland West", in reference to Elvis Presley's Graceland. Newton said, "Elvis was a dear friend, but to use Graceland as a way to promote what we're doing would not be right. It's Shenandoah, and it will always be Shenandoah."

During the town board meeting, 33 people spoke against the project, with 11 speaking in favor. Despite the board's recommendation, the Clark County Commission approved the project in November 2010. To alleviate concerns from residents, the public entrance to Casa de Shenandoah would be on Sunset Road instead of Tomiyasu Lane. Plans for a wedding pavilion were scrapped entirely, although Newton would continue to host private weddings at the estate. Casa de Shenandoah was originally intended to open as an attraction in February 2011, although work proceeded slowly on the project following the approval. The museum was later expected to be open by the end of 2011. In October 2011, Newton said he expected the estate to be opened for public tours by February 2012.

==== Legal issues ====
Work on the project was halted in May 2012, when CSD filed a lawsuit against Newton. The lawsuit alleged that:

- Newton and his family had interfered with the development plans, stating that they refused to move out of the mansion and that they refused to allow their new private residence on the property to be built.
- Newton refused to catalog and turn over personal property and memorabilia for the museum.
- Newton refused to remove horses from the property; he had 55 horses there, whereas CSD stated that less than 20 would be needed for the new project.
- Newton allegedly sexually harassed a young woman who had been hired by CSD to take care of and train the horses.
- Newton had various large dogs freely roaming the property; the lawsuit alleged that they had bitten people multiple times and that Newton refused to remove them to allow for the opening of the museum.

Newton's attorney denied that the allegations were true, and stated that CSD was to blame for failure to get the museum and new residence built. Another allegation, stating that Newton's animals were not properly cared for, was also denied. Clark declined to get involved in the lawsuit, stating that Kennedy "is wrongly accusing the Newtons and mismanaging his role of leadership. I will not condone nor support his actions or anyone who is supporting him with this lawsuit."

The Newtons countersued, alleging that Kennedy had entered their house without permission and that they had been locked out of their horse barn. They also alleged that a computer with their business files had been taken from Newton's home office. A temporary restraining order was issued against Kennedy, who was not to come within 50 feet of the family and the estate. Newton stated that the project would not proceed with Kennedy as manager, and that he regretted entering into the deal with him. There was the possibility that the project would be revived with new investors.

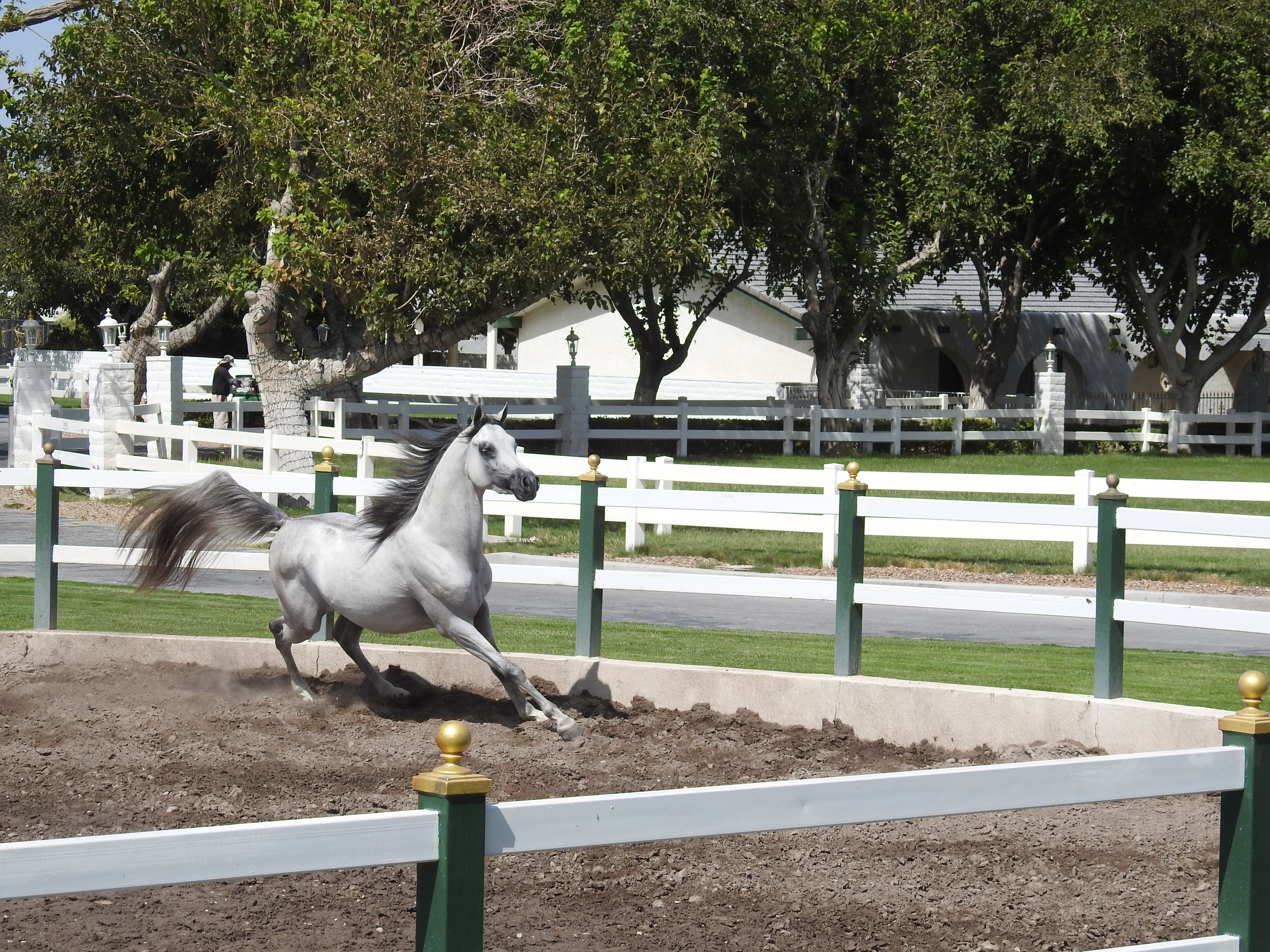
A horse at the ranch (2016)

In June 2012, a county judge denied CSD's motion to move some of the estate's horses to another location. CSD stated that it had spent approximately $888,000 to feed and care for the horses. CSD also stated that there should only be about 10 to 15 horses on the property, which consisted of about 15 acres of grazing land; the property contained 51 Arabian horses. CSD had been spending $37,000 in monthly costs for the horses, and stated that it could not afford to continue doing so. Up to that time, CSD had spent $50 million on the project. Later in June 2012, CSD members voted to call the new project "The Fabulous Las Vegas Museum". During the same month, the Newtons posted a $5,000 bond as protection for economic damages that CSD could suffer during litigation. This was later increased to $50,000.

In July 2012, as a result of the horse ruling, CSD sought a $1 million loan to continue taking care of the Arabian horse herd. The Newtons stated that CSD had sufficient funds for horse upkeep without a loan. The Newtons' attorney stated that the terms of the loan were set to allow a limited liability company to foreclose on the loan and take over the property in the event that the loan is not repaid within 30 days. Later in the month, CSD alleged that the Newton family was experiencing financial difficulty when they sold the property, and that they had no real intention to cooperate with the plans to turn it into an attraction. The Newtons and Kennedy also accused each other of posing a threat to one another.

In August 2012, CSD requested court approval to dissolve the management company that was to create the attraction. Such an action would give CSD complete ownership of the property. Approval of the request was delayed until December 2012, to give the Newtons time to gather facts to refute CSD. That month, CSD sought a patent for a "Welcome to the Fabulous Las Vegas Museum" sign, while the Newtons wanted the museum to retain its intended focus on Wayne Newton. In October 2012, a three-week jury trial between Newton and CSD LLC was set for May 2013. Later that month, CSD LLC was placed into Chapter 11 bankruptcy, and the company dropped its plans for the attraction. In December 2012, a bankruptcy court judge approved the ranch and 13 acres across the street to be sold. The property was valued at $50.8 million.

In February 2013, CSD filed a lawsuit stating that the Newtons were micromanagers who repeatedly obstructed progress on the project. The lawsuit alleged that the Newtons demanded the location of their new house to be moved "several feet in one direction, and then several feet in another," and that they subsequently requested $5 million for the home's construction, more than the allotted $2 million. The lawsuit also stated that Newton refused to provide his personal property for the planned museum, and that he and his wife complained repeatedly about the contractors and subcontractors hired to work on the project. The lawsuit was dismissed later that year.

In March 2013, CSD LLC received permission from a bankruptcy court to sell the ranch's approximately 280 exotic birds, fish and mammals for $27,300, to the Zoological Wildlife Conservation Center and the Sloth Captive Husbandry Research Center in Rainier, Oregon. Later that month, a bankruptcy court judge sealed the case concerning CSD's bankruptcy. Kathleen Newton stated that the family would continue living in the house if it were sold. At the time, her sister also lived in a house on the property, while Newton's 92-year-old longtime personal secretary lived in a third house on the site. In April 2013, the Newtons, the Harbers, Kennedy, and others reached a settlement, resulting in the lawsuits being resolved.

==== Further developments ====
Newton and his family moved out of Casa de Shenandoah in June 2013, after purchasing new residential property nearby. Newton later said he was relieved when he and his family moved out of the estate, stating, "By the time we got to the point of leaving, I had had enough of the toll it was taking on my family. We had been fighting in court for a long time. [...] It just wasn't worth it anymore."

Under CSD's bankruptcy reorganization plan, Lacy Harber would own the entire company and would have full control of Casa de Shenandoah. The reorganization plan was approved later in June 2013, and the company intended to proceed with its plans to open the property as an attraction later in the summer. However, several aspects would now be absent, including Newton's animals and the museum of memorabilia. The Harbers spent up to $20 million in renovations to the property over the next several months, including new flooring, bathrooms, hardware, stair railing, landscaping, and wallpaper. In September 2013, the Harbers put Casa de Shenandoah up for sale at a cost of $70 million, making it one of the most expensive homes for sale in the Las Vegas Valley. The property sale would include eight homes, various horse stables, ponds, and a private jet. In December 2013, the property was renamed Sunset Springs Ranch. In July 2014, CSD had plans to add a wedding chapel to the property.

The ranch was put up for sale again in September 2014, at a cost of $30 million. The ranch was expected to be sold to a housing developer which would build up to 80 homes on the land. Nearly 1,000 people signed a petition to have the ranch designated a historical site. Later in September 2014, Lacy Harber contacted the Newtons with a proposal for them to work out a deal and reclaim the property, an idea which the Newtons accepted. This ended plans for the housing subdivision, and Newton later said about the property, "This really is a piece of Las Vegas history. It would be a shame for it to be turned into something else." In December 2014, the "Casa de Shenandoah" name was restored, and the Newtons planned to revive the attraction project, while also planning to eventually reside on the property again. The Harbers spent more than $100 million to renovate Casa de Shenandoah into a museum.

==== Operation ====
A VIP party was held on the night of September 17, 2015, ahead of the public opening the following day. Attendees to the VIP party included Carrot Top, Clint Holmes, Lance Burton, Robert Torti, Sabrina Bryan, and the Harbers. At the time of the opening, Newton said, "Nobody thought we'd be back here. When we moved out, I never thought I'd be back here, either." The Newtons continued living at their newer house following the public opening of Casa de Shenandoah, although Wayne Newton visited the ranch every day. Within five days of its opening, approximately 400 people had visited the ranch daily.

The newly built Visitor Center across from the ranch contained Newton's memorabilia, shops, and a short documentary film about Newton's life and the creation of Casa de Shenandoah. The video tour was narrated by Newton. Three shops were each respectively named after Newton, his wife, and their daughter: Wayne's World, Kat's Korner, and Lauren's Lair.

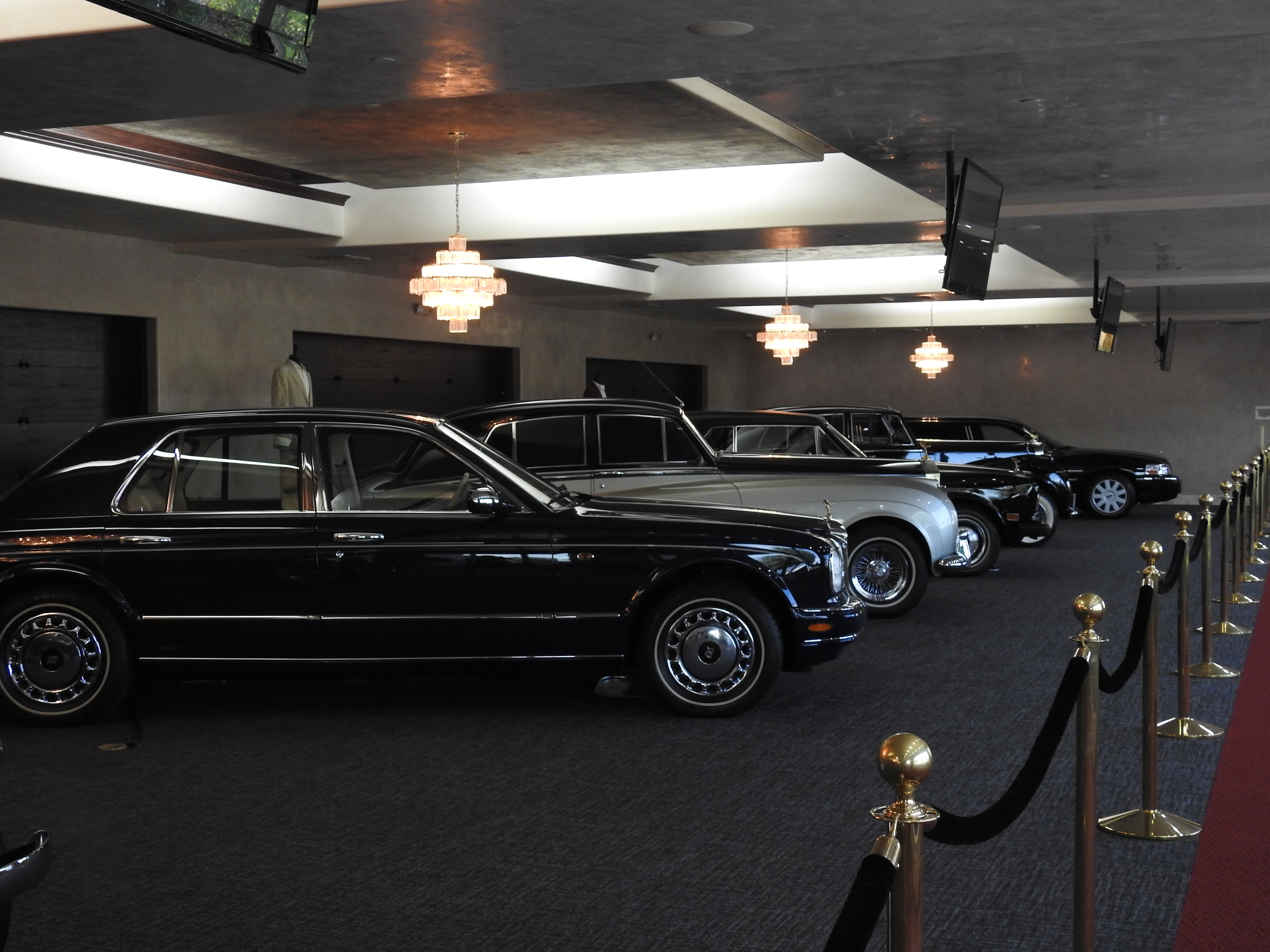
Newton's automobile collection (2016)

Featured on the tour was Newton's collection of 13 rare automobiles, mostly consisting of Rolls-Royces and Bentleys. The collection included vehicles owned by Johnny Carson and Liberace, and two one-of-a-kind cars: a 1934 Rolls-Royce and a 1983 Mercedes-Benz. Also featured on the tour was Newton's Native American artifact collection, his private jet, armed forces items, and letters he received from U.S. presidents. Newton's memorabilia dated back 60 years. The property contains 1,000,000 sq ft (93,000 m^{2}) of grass, and the tour also featured Newton's zoo of animals.

CSD LLC was allowed to hold events on the ranch under strict guidelines set by the county. This included no outdoor loudspeakers, no alcohol sales, and no events after dark. CSD also could not charge for events. However, these rules would later be ignored, and neighbors subsequently complained about events at the property for reasons such as loud music and traffic congestion. County commissioner Jim Gibson said CSD was "doing things well beyond what they were authorized to do."

In early November 2017, the Nevada District Office of the Small Business Administration (SBA) held a banquet on the property, an event which included a $1,500 cash bar. Neighbors complained that the event utilized loudspeakers and that it lasted after dark, prompting an investigation by county code enforcement officials. The SBA also opened an investigation into the event, as SBA money was illegally used to pay for alcohol at the event. Subsequent controversial events held at the ranch included a $10,000 wedding and a car show. In April 2018, more than 1,200 people attended a dining and dancing event that included live music until 9:30 p.m.

Casa de Shenandoah closed to the public on April 24, 2018, although the estate continued to host a few more events into the next month. Newton said the closure was necessary to allow for renovations, which could not take place with tours ongoing. He said the property would reopen as soon as possible. However, on July 10, 2018, the Newtons withdrew the permits used for the property's museum and tour operations. Newton said, "As of now, we are just taking a breather and deciding what we want to do in the future. We have not wanted to make any rush decisions." Cosmetic work on the property, including exterior painting, would continue. During the same month, CSD stated it would not use the property as a museum or event space for at least a year. The animals were required to be relocated by mid-September 2018.

=== 2019 sale and subsequent legal issues ===
Casa de Shenandoah was sold to Smoketree LLC in July 2019, for $5.56 million. Earlier that year, Newton had offered to buy back the estate for $6 million. Although he thought an agreement had been reached, he was disappointed to later learn that the estate was being sold to another buyer. In August 2019, Newton took legal action against Smoketree, who believed that the purchase included the estate's contents. Newton denied that this was the case, and he sought to retrieve property from the estate such as antiques, art, and personal items. The visitor center and its 10-acre site were sold in September 2019, to Harsch Investment Properties. In February 2020, Newton won a preliminary battle to reacquire his belongings. Newton also owned the "Casa de Shenandoah" name, which was removed from the estate.

In August 2019, a woman sued Newton and CSD over an alleged incident that occurred at the estate in 2017, in which her teenage daughter was bitten by his pet capuchin monkey while on the tour. Newton's wife stated that the family was not directly involved with estate operations at the time of the incident and had no knowledge of it. In April 2020, a woman filed a second lawsuit against Newton, claiming that she too had been bitten by his pet monkey during a tour in 2018.

In August 2020, Smoketree put the estate up for sale at a cost of $29.9 million.

== In popular culture ==
Season 2 episode 22 "Lucy and Wayne Newton" of Here's Lucy was centered on the 4 main characters becoming ranch hands at CSD after a bungled visit to Las Vegas... CSD was prominently featured throughout the episode. A 90-minute television program, The Wayne Newton Special, was filmed at Casa de Shenandoah in 1974, and aired later that year on NBC. The ranch was also featured in The Rockford Files and Vega$. Casa de Shenandoah and Newton appear in the 1997 film Vegas Vacation. In June 2005, Newton filmed a series of introductions for Total Request Live that involved the ranch's various animals. The ranch was featured as the finishing point in the finale of The Amazing Race 15 in 2009. Casa de Shenandoah was also featured in a 2011 episode of Confessions: Animal Hoarding, in which the estate accepted approximately 200 lovebirds previously kept in a hoarder house. A June 2018 episode of The Bachelorette featured a group date at Casa de Shenandoah.
