= Clay Harbor =

American football player (born 1987)

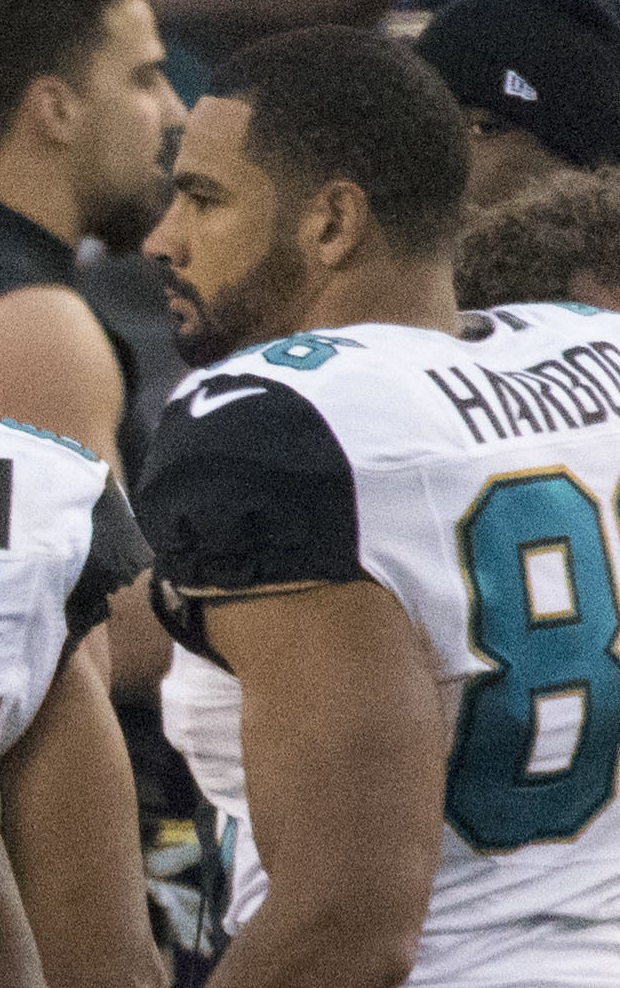
- Harbor with the Jacksonville Jaguars in 2014

No. 82, 86, 81, 84
- Position: Tight end

Personal information
- Born: July 2, 1987 (age 39); Libertyville, Illinois, U.S.
- Listed height: 6 ft 3 in (1.91 m)
- Listed weight: 240 lb (109 kg)

Career information
- High school: Dwight (IL)
- College: Missouri State (2005–2009)
- NFL draft: 2010: 4th round, 125th overall pick

Career history
- Philadelphia Eagles (2010–2012); Jacksonville Jaguars (2013–2015); New England Patriots (2016); Detroit Lions (2016); New Orleans Saints (2017); Team 9 (2020)*
- * Offseason or practice squad member only

Awards and highlights
- First-team All-American (2009)

Career NFL statistics
- Receptions: 114
- Receiving yards: 1,170
- Receiving touchdowns: 8
- Stats at Pro Football Reference

Clayton Lee Harbor (born July 2, 1987) is an American former professional football player who was a tight end in the National Football League (NFL). He was selected by the Philadelphia Eagles in the fourth round of the 2010 NFL draft. He played college football for the Missouri State Bears. He was also a member of the Jacksonville Jaguars, New England Patriots, Detroit Lions, and New Orleans Saints.

== Early life and education ==
Harbor is the son of Jeff Harbor and Donna Norman. He grew up in Dwight, Illinois and attended Dwight High School, which had a graduating class of only 74 during Harbor's senior year. He was a four-year letterman in football, basketball, and track. In his final three seasons, he earned All-Interstate 8 Conference honors in each sport. In football, Harbor played wide receiver and safety, and broke the school record with 60 receptions, 1,079 yards, and 19 touchdowns.

Harbor was not offered a scholarship in football, and decided to try and earn a basketball scholarship until he sustained an injury during his senior basketball season. Harbor's brother Cory, who played linebacker for the Missouri State Bears, persuaded the coaches at Missouri State to give Harbor a chance, and he was offered a scholarship.

He earned a Bachelor of Science in Hospitality Administration and Management from Missouri State University and is currently pursuing Master of Business Administration student at Kelley School of Business, Indiana University Bloomington.

== College career ==
During his freshman year at Missouri State, Harbor was redshirted. The following year, as a redshirt freshman, he played in 11 games, starting two of the eleven at wide receiver. He caught six passes for 73 yards in 2006. His best game that season was in a win against Southwest Baptist University (of the NAIA), in which he recorded three receptions for 34 yards, including a touchdown. He also caught a 31-yard pass against Oklahoma State.

Harbor switched positions as a redshirt sophomore in 2007, moving from wide receiver to tight end. Against Southern Illinois, he caught seven passes for 87 yards. He made five receptions for 106 yards against Indiana State University, and he set school records for receptions and yards in a single season as a tight end with 45 receptions and 647 yards. Following the season, he earned Associated Press third-team All-America and first-team All-Missouri Valley Football Conference (MVFC) honors. As a sophomore, he was named Missouri State's offensive player of the year.

As a junior, Harbor led the Bears with 40 receptions for 457 yards. He earned second-team Associated Press All-America honors after the season. By the end of his junior season, he kept his streak alive of 22 consecutive games with a reception. Twice he earned Missouri State University Coors Player of the Week in his junior season. He also broke the 1,000 career receiving yard mark on his way to receive first-team All-MVFC honors for the second straight year as well as Missouri State's Offensive Player of the Year.

As a senior, Harbor tallied 59 receptions, which was second-most in the nation among tight ends, with 729 yards. He was first among tight ends in receiving yards per game with 66.3 yards. He ended his career as the all-time receptions leader at Missouri State with 150 as well as third in receiving yards with 1,906. Following the season, he earned Football Championship Subdivision first-team All-America honors and first-team All-MVFC honors for the third straight year. He was also placed on the MVFC All-Silver Anniversary Squad.

== Professional career ==
Pre-draft measurables
Height	Weight	Arm length	Hand span	40-yard dash	10-yard split	20-yard split	20-yard shuttle	Three-cone drill	Vertical jump	Broad jump	Bench press
6 ft 2 5/8 in (1.90 m)	252 lb (114 kg)	32 5/8 in (0.83 m)	9 1/2 in (0.24 m)	4.58 s	1.65 s	2.69 s	4.36 s	7.12 s	40.0 in (1.02 m)	10 ft 0 in (3.05 m)	30 reps
All values from NFL Combine/Pro Day

Harbor was one of 20 players selected to participate in the NFL Scouting Combine from the FCS or a lower division. Among tight ends, he finished first in the bench press with 30 repetitions of 225 pounds, second in the vertical jump with 40 inches, and fourth in the 40-yard dash with 4.62 seconds.

=== Philadelphia Eagles ===
Harbor was selected by the Philadelphia Eagles in the fourth round of the 2010 NFL draft with the 125th overall pick. He was signed to a four-year contract worth $2.243 million with $453,000 guaranteed on June 15, 2010. In 2010, he recorded nine receptions for 72 yards and one touchdown. Against the San Francisco 49ers as a rookie, he caught three passes for 55 yards and had a touchdown reception. Harbor was released by the team on August 31, 2013.

=== Jacksonville Jaguars ===
Harbor was claimed off waivers by the Jacksonville Jaguars on September 1, 2013. He played all 16 games in the 2013 season for the Jaguars, catching 24 passes for 292 yards, and scoring two touchdowns.

=== New England Patriots ===
On March 30, 2016, Harbor signed with the New England Patriots. On October 3, 2016, he was released by the Patriots.

=== Detroit Lions ===
On October 4, 2016, Harbor was signed by the Lions.

=== New Orleans Saints ===
On May 14, 2017, Harbor was signed by the New Orleans Saints. He was placed on injured reserve on August 28, 2017.

=== Team 9 ===
Harbor signed with the XFL's Team 9 practice squad on March 10, 2020. He had his contract terminated when the league suspended operations on April 10, 2020.

== NFL career statistics ==
Legend
**Bold**	Career high

=== Regular season ===
Year	Team	Games		Receiving					Fumbles	
Year	Team	GP	GS	Rec	Yds	Avg	Lng	TD	Fum	Lost
2010	PHI	9	6	9	72	8.0	24	1	0	0
2011	PHI	**16**	3	13	163	**12.5**	27	1	0	0
2012	PHI	14	**9**	25	186	7.4	19	**2**	1	**1**
2013	JAX	**16**	7	24	**292**	12.2	31	**2**	**2**	**1**
2014	JAX	13	8	**26**	289	11.1	**59**	1	0	0
2015	JAX	15	3	14	149	10.6	26	1	0	0
2016	NE	3	0	–	–	–	–	–	–	–
2016	DET	12	2	3	19	6.3	9	0	0	0
2017	NO	0	0	Did not play due to injury						
Career		98	38	114	1,170	10.3	59	8	3	2

=== Postseason ===
Year	Team	Games		Receiving					Fumbles	
Year	Team	GP	GS	Rec	Yds	Avg	Lng	TD	Fum	Lost
2010	PHI	1	1	–	–	–	–	–	–	–
2016	DET	1	0	–	–	–	–	–	–	–
2017	NO	0	0	Did not play due to injury						
Career		2	1	0	0	0	0	0	0	0

== Reality television ==
Harbor was a contestant on the 14th season of The Bachelorette, starring Rebecca "Becca" Kufrin, in 2018. Harbor, however, left the show after injuring his wrist while playing tackle football with the other contestants. The injury required surgery.

He was on the sixth season of Bachelor in Paradise in 2019.
