= Esther J. Piercy =

American librarian and cataloger (1905–1967)

- Born: June 15, 1905; Los Angeles, California, US
- Died: January 10, 1967 (aged 61); Baltimore, Maryland, US
- Education: University of Idaho, University of Illinois

Esther J. Piercy (June 15, 1905 – January 10, 1967) was an American librarian whose work in cataloging helped set standards and move libraries towards greater efficiency during the profession's shift to computer automation. Her efforts as the founding editor of Library Resources & Technical Services helped shape library technical services for decades.

== Early life and education ==
Esther June Piercy was born in Los Angeles, California, on June 15, 1905. She received a Bachelor of Arts degree in 1930 from the University of Idaho and a Bachelor of Science degree in library science from the University of Illinois in 1932.

== Career ==
After receiving her degrees, Piercy worked for ten years (1934–1944) within the cataloging department of the University of New Mexico library. In 1944 she became assistant librarian and head of the processing department at the Worcester Public Library. From 1948 until her death in 1967, Piercy worked at the Enoch Pratt Free Library in Baltimore, Maryland. During her time at Enoch Pratt she planned and implemented a complete recataloging of the collection, which "became a model for schools and small public libraries".

She was a strong proponent of automation, and in 1963 anticipated a future where the library card catalog would be replaced with computer-accessible information.

== Service to librarianship ==
Her leadership work in American Library Association committees led to the formation of standards for bookmobile service and for children's librarianship. She was a member of ALA's Council and executive board, as well as serving from 1961 to 1967 on the Dewey Decimal Classification Editorial Policy Committee. In 1958 she was awarded the Margaret Mann Citation by ALA for achievement in cataloging and classification. From 1959 to 1960, she directed a survey of the Cataloging-in-Source experiment conducted by the Library of Congress; though her 1960 report was pessimistic about the possibility of a national project which would provide cataloging within published books, it was the prelude to the successful 1971 introduction of the Cataloging in Publication program.

Piercy served as the editor of the Journal of Cataloging and Classification from 1950 to 1956. She became the founding editor of Library Resources & Technical Services (LRTS) in 1957, when it was created from the merger of Serials Slants and the Journal of Cataloging and Classification. Her book Commonsense cataloging was originally published in 1965 as a guide to cataloging for school and small public libraries; it went through four editions and was also published in Spanish.

A lover of the written word, Piercy was also a frequent reviewer of books for The Baltimore Sun.

Piercy died of a cerebral hemorrhage in Baltimore, Maryland on January 10, 1967. She is buried in Hillsboro, Oregon. Upon her death, a Festschrift issue of Library Resources & Technical Services was planned; so much material was received that the memorial was published in two issues (volume 11, number 3-4).

== Legacy ==
After her death, librarian Robert L. Talmadge described Piercy's career as "marked by service so distinguished as to rank her a statesman [sic] among librarians on the national scene."

Piercy was supportive of young library staff members and encouraged their professional development and participation within library organizations. Each year, the Association for Library Collections and Technical Services awards the Esther J. Piercy Award to a librarian "who has shown outstanding promise for continuing contribution and leadership" in the field of library collections and technical services; the award was established in 1968.
