= Online Audiovisual Catalogers =

Group of library catalogers for nonprint resources

Online Audiovisual Catalogers, Inc.
- Abbreviation: OLAC
- Formation: 1980; 46 years ago
- Type: Non-profit
- Purpose: "In 1980, OLAC was founded to establish and maintain a group that could speak for catalogers of audiovisual materials. OLAC provides a means for exchange of information, continuing education, and communication among catalogers of audiovisual materials and with the Library of Congress. While maintaining a voice with the bibliographic utilities that speak for catalogers of audiovisual materials, OLAC works toward common understanding of AV cataloging practices and standards."
- President: Mary L Huismann
- Website: olacinc.org

Online Audiovisual Catalogers, Inc., otherwise known as OLAC, was founded in 1980 as a group of library catalogers involved in the cataloging of audiovisual materials, but now supports the work of catalogers working on all nonprint resources. OLAC provides a way for catalogers to have a method of communication among themselves as well as with the Library of Congress. The first official meeting of the group was held on July 1, 1980, in New York City with Nancy B. Olson chairing the group of catalogers.

== Activities ==
=== Cataloging Policy Committee (CAPC) ===
OLAC's Cataloging Policy Committee (CAPC) represents audiovisual catalogers in national and international cataloging communities to help with the development of cataloging standards and rules, especially with MARC standards. OLAC has established liaison relationships with Subcommittee on Genre/Form Implementation (SAC-SGFI), MARBI, CC:DA, the NACO AV Funnel and OCLC A significant contribution to audiovisual cataloging in the new RDA standard was that of assigning uniform titles for motion pictures, which OLAC produced along with the Music Library Association.

Another significant contribution to the library community has been OLAC's collaborative work, through its liaison relationships such as the SAC-SGFI, and its own internal efforts on the Library of Congress Genre-Form Term (LCGFT) projects. Once LCGFT was officially adopted, OLAC produced a best practices guide for their usage and application by catalogers which is widely used by many colleges universities to establish their own internal practices, such as Middlebury College and BYU. The Federal Depository Library Program also refers catalogers to OLAC produced documents regarding cataloging motion pictures, streaming media, and more on its Bibliographic Cataloging: Audiovisual Resources page.

=== OLAC Conferences ===
OLAC hosts a biennial conference for catalogers to come together and discuss topics related to cataloging, and has held a joint conference at least four times with the Music OCLC Users Group organization over the years.

=== Nancy B. Olson Award ===
The Nancy B. Olson award, formerly the OLAC Award, is named for the group's founder. It is awarded to individuals who have made "significant contributions to the advancement and understanding of audiovisual cataloging."

== Publications ==
OLAC has published many reports, thought papers, and training materials over the years to support and advance the work of cataloging audiovisual materials. Currently, OLAC's work has focused on a series of 'best practices' guides for cataloging nonprint materials based on national and international standards.

According to a 2007 study with 354 respondents, special format catalogers (i.e., non-print materials) report spending the majority of their time cataloging electronic resources, sound recordings (both audio and music), and video resources, and of these special formats catalogers 31% were members of OLAC. Bothmann also found that more than half of the respondents said that OLAC provided the most support for special formats cataloging.

- Best Practices for Cataloging DVD-Video and Blu-ray Discs Using RDA and MARC21
- Best Practices for Cataloging Streaming Media Using RDA and MARC21
- Best Practices for Cataloging Video Games Using RDA and MARC21
- Library of Congress Genre-Form Thesaurus (LCGFT) for Moving Images: Best Practices

Previous publications included similar best practices guides, but in older standards like AACR2.

== Membership ==
As of May 2004, there were 379 personal members in OLAC.
