= Roy F. Schulz =

Roy F. Schultz (November 20, 1920 – May 1, 2010) was an American farmer and politician.

Schulz was born in Mankato, Blue Earth County, Minnesota. He attended Blue Earth County public schools and graduated from St. Clair High School in St. Clair, Minnesota. He went to the Mankato States Teachers College (now Minnesota State University, Mankato).

Schulz lived in Mankato, Minnesota with his wife and family, and was a farmer.

He served in the Minnesota House of Representatives from 1951 to 1970, and was a Republican. He then worked for the Minnesota Real Estate Tax Players Association as a lobbyist for twenty years.

Schulz died at Benedictine Living Community in St. Peter, Minnesota. The funeral and burial were in Mankato, Minnesota.
