= Beverage function =

Catering events where beverages are served

In catering, beverage functions are functions where beverages are served.

== Who pays ==
One important issue of beverage functions is who pays for the drinks. There are three main scenarios:

- a cash bar (a.k.a. a no-host bar): Attendees pay for their own drinks.
- a cash bar with tickets: The host issues vouchers to attendees for a limited number of free drinks, and attendees pay for any further drinks themselves.
- a host bar (a.k.a. an open bar): The host pays for all drinks, either by the hour, by the bottle, by the drink, or per person.

Choosing among the several options is influenced by several factors. One such factor is etiquette. Providing a cash bar at a function such as a wedding reception is generally considered poor etiquette in the United States.

Another such factor is cost. A cash bar is the least expensive option for a host. However, there are alternatives between a cash bar and a fully open bar that can limit costs. The host can set a hard limit on cost, beyond which all beverages have to be paid for by attendees. The host can specify that specific beverages, such as a few selected types of wines and beers, are paid for by the host, and that attendees pay for all other types of drinks. The host can set a time limit for an open bar, beyond which it reverts to being a cash bar. Or more complex combinations of these can be employed.

Some venues, such as hotels, subject to the terms of their liquor licenses, may allow attendees to bring their own alcoholic drinks to beverage functions. However, they may also charge attendees a fee, usually charged per bottle (either at a flat rate or as a percentage of the bottle's price), for doing so, known as corkage.

Cash bars have their problems for caterers and venue managers. One major problem is the possibility of theft. To prevent this, managers can set up cashiers, who take money and issue drinks tickets, separate from the serving staff who actually serve drinks. Brown and Godsmark recommend to managers that they place only their most trustworthy staff in charge of the cash bars at banquets.

Conversely, open bars have problems for hosts, in that they can result in an increased number of intoxicated, and potentially obnoxious and aggressive, attendees, as compared to other options. With open bars, the level of waste also increases (which is reflected in increased costs to the host). Since attendees do not pay for their drinks, they often do not consider them to be as valuable as they would if they had paid for them themselves. This results in drinks being abandoned or forgotten, or simply discarded by guests who leave their drinks (as they go and do something else) after only partly consuming them and then replace them with fresh ones rather than finishing the drinks that they already had.

== Types of drinks served ==
The types of drinks served at functions can vary, according to the type of the event, and the types and ages of the attendees. In particular, at wedding receptions whether the bride and groom are themselves alcohol drinkers can affect whether attendees pay for their own alcoholic drinks, or indeed whether alcohol is offered at all. Similarly, alcohol is not served at beverage events for children.

Another factor that affects whether alcohol is served is liability, for subsequent intoxication and anything that results from it. Many U.S. jurisdictions allow the victims of accidents to sue not only the person who was intoxicated, but also the person who served the alcohol, the person or company employing the bartender, and the board of directors of the company.
