= The Bachelorette (American TV series) season 14 =

14th season of television series

The Bachelorette
- Season 14
- Promotional poster
- Starring: Becca Kufrin
- Presented by: Chris Harrison
- No. of contestants: 28
- Winner: Garrett Yrigoyen
- Runner-up: Blake Horstmann
- No. of episodes: 11

Release
- Original network: ABC
- Original release: May 28 – August 6, 2018

Additional information
- Filming dates: March 15 – May 10, 2018

Season chronology
- ← Previous; Season 13 Next → Season 15

The fourteenth season of The Bachelorette premiered on May 28, 2018. This season features Becca Kufrin, a 28-year-old publicist from Prior Lake, Minnesota.

Kufrin was the winner of season 22 of The Bachelor featuring Arie Luyendyk Jr.; however, Luyendyk broke off his engagement with Kufrin to resume a relationship with runner-up Lauren Burnham, to whom he is now married. The season concluded on August 6, 2018, with Kufrin accepting a proposal from 29-year-old medical sales representative Garrett Yrigoyen. They announced their engagement had ended on September 1, 2020.

== Production ==
=== Casting and contestants ===
Casting began during season thirteen of The Bachelorette. Kufrin was named as the bachelorette during the "After the Final Rose" special of season 22 of The Bachelor on March 6, 2018. During the live finale of the latter season, Kufrin met the first five contestants: Lincoln, Blake, Ryan, Chase and Darius.

Notable contestants included Philadelphia Eagles tight end Clay Harbor and undrafted free agent Colton Underwood.

=== Filming and development ===
Filming began on March 15, 2018, at The Bachelor Mansion, it was reported in Richmond, Virginia during April 6–9 at Lombardy Street, Virginia State Capitol, Edgar Allan Poe Museum, Veil Brewing Company, and Carpenter Theatre. Besides Virginia, this season also included visits to Utah, Nevada, The Bahamas, Thailand, and Maldives. Appearances on this season are musicians Lil Jon, Richard Marx, Granger Smith, Wayne Newton, Morgan Evans, Baha Men and Betty Who and sports personalities Keyshawn Johnson, Valerie Fleming and Shauna Rohbock.

Virginia governor Ralph Northam also made his appearance as the audience member in the group date held in Richmond, Virginia.

== Contestants ==
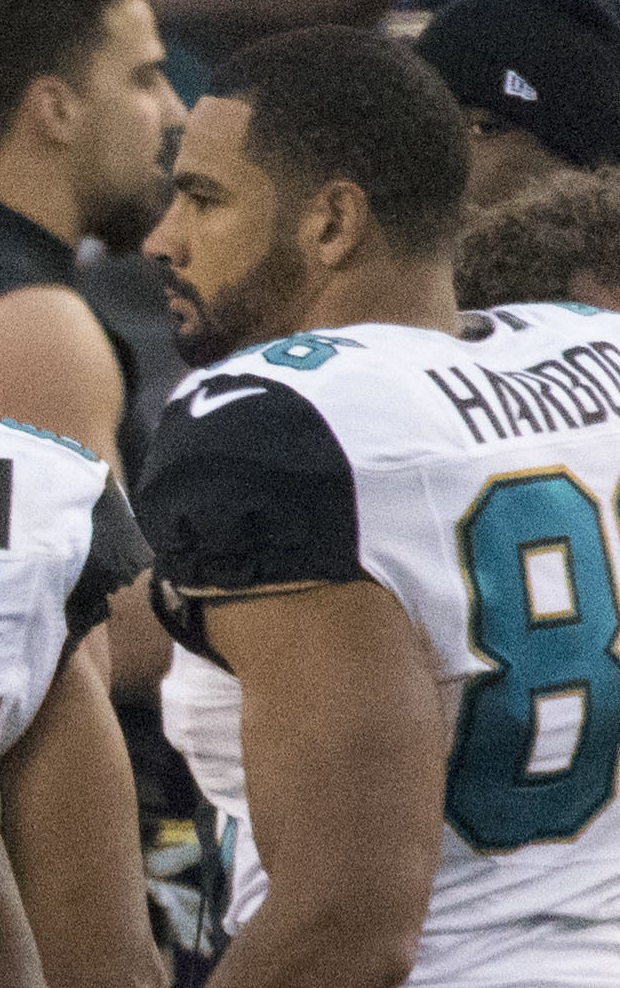
Clay Harbor

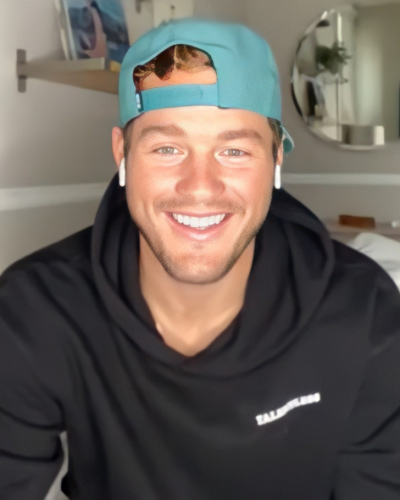
Colton Underwood

The first 5 contestants were revealed in The Bachelor season 22 finale on March 6, 2018. The full cast of 28 contestants was later revealed on May 18.

Name	Age	Hometown	Occupation	Outcome	Place	Ref
Garrett Yrigoyen	29	Manteca, California	Medical Sales Representative	Winner	1	
Blake Horstmann	28	Bailey, Colorado	Sales Rep	Runner-up	2	
Jason Tartick	29	Buffalo, New York	Senior Corporate Banker	Week 9	3	
Colton Underwood	26	Washington, Illinois	Former Pro Football Player	Week 8	4	
William "Wills" Reid	29	Los Angeles, California	Graphic Designer	Week 7	5	
Leandro "Leo" Dottavio	31	Valley Glen, California	Actor	Week 7	6	
Connor Obrochta	25	St. Petersburg, Florida	Fitness Coach	Week 6	7-8	
Lincoln Adim	26	Boston, Massachusetts	Account Sales Executive	Week 6	7-8	
Chris Randone	30	Orlando, Florida	Sales Trainer	Week 6	9	
John Graham	28	San Francisco, California	Software Engineer	Week 5	10	
Jordan Kimball	26	Crystal River, Florida	Male Model	Week 5	11	
David Ravitz	25	Cherry Hill, New Jersey	Venture Capitalist	Week 5	12	
Christon Staples	31	Saginaw, Michigan	Former Harlem Globetrotter	Week 4	13-14	
Nick Spetsas	27	Palm Coast, Florida	Attorney	Week 4	13-14	
Jean Blanc	31	Boston, Massachusetts	Colognoisseur	Week 4	15	
Mike Renner	27	Cincinnati, Ohio	Sports Analyst	Week 3	16-17	
Ryan Peterson	26	Mashpee, Massachusetts	Banjoist	Week 3	16-17	
Clay Harbor	30	Dwight, Illinois	Pro Football Player	Week 3	18 (quit)	
Alex Templeman	31	Alpharetta, Georgia	Construction Manager	Week 2	19–21	
Rickey Jasper	27	Ashburn, Virginia	IT Consultant	Week 2	19–21	
Trent Jespersen	28	Carroll, Iowa	Realtor	Week 2	19–21	
Chase Vergason	27	Sanford, Florida	Advertising Vice President	Week 1	22–27	
Christian Estrada	28	San Diego, California	Banker	Week 1	22–27	
Darius Feaster	26	Mequon, Wisconsin	Pharmaceutical Sales Rep	Week 1	22–27	
Grant Vandevanter	27	Danville, California	Electrician	Week 1	22–27	
Joe Amabile	31	Hegewisch, Illinois	Grocery Store Owner	Week 1	22–27	
Kamil Nicalek	30	Monroe, New York	Social Media Participant	Week 1	22–27	
Jake Enyeart	29	Minneapolis, Minnesota	Marketing Consultant	Week 1	28	

=== Future appearances ===
==== The Bachelor ====
Colton Underwood was chosen as the lead for season 23 of The Bachelor.

==== Bachelor in Paradise ====
Season 5

David Ravitz, Kamil Nicalek, Joe Amabile, John Graham, Jordan Kimball, Nick Spetsas, Chris Randone, Colton Underwood, Connor Obrochta, Wills Reid, and Leo Dottavio returned for season 5 of Bachelor in Paradise. Reid and Spetsas were eliminated in week 1. Dottavio was removed in week 3. Obrochta and Ravitz were eliminated in week 3. Underwood quit in week 4. Amabile quit in week 5. Graham split from Olivia Goethals in week 6. Nicalek left in a relationship with Annaliese Puccini. Kimball left engaged to Jenna Cooper, and Randone left engaged to Krystal Nielson.

Season 6

Kimball and Reid along with Blake Horstmann, Christian Estrada, and Clay Harbor returned for season 6 of Bachelor in Paradise. Estrada and Kimball were removed by production in week 2. Reid was eliminated in week 2. Horstmann quit in week 5. Harbor split from Nicole Lopez-Alvar in week 6.

Season 7

Amabile and Kufrin returned for season 7 of Bachelor in Paradise. Kufrin split from Thomas Jacobs in week 6, although they later got back together. Amabile got engaged to Serena Pitt in week 6.

==== Bachelor in Paradise Australia ====
Season 2

Obrochta later appeared on season 2 of Bachelor in Paradise Australia. He left in a relationship with Shannon Baff.

==== Bachelor in Paradise Canada ====
Season 1

Nicalek returned for the inaugural season of Bachelor in Paradise Canada. He split from Caitlin Clemmens in week 5.

==== Dancing with the Stars ====
Outside of the Bachelor Nation franchise, Amabile competed in season 27 of Dancing With the Stars and was partnered with Jenna Johnson. He made it to the semi-finals before being eliminated. Kimball joined Amabile and Johnson during week 4's Trio Night.

==== All Star Shore ====
Blake Horstmann later competed on All Star Shore, a reality TV series on Paramount+.

==== The Goat ====
Amabile appeared on the first season of The Goat.

=== The Traitors ===
Colton is set to compete on the fourth season of The Traitors.

== Call-out order ==
Order	Bachelors	Week									
Order	Bachelors	1	2	3	4	5	6	7	8	9	10
1	Colton	Garrett	Jean Blanc	Colton	Garrett	Colton	Jason	Colton	Blake	Garrett	Garrett
2	Grant	Lincoln	Blake	Chris	Wills	Blake	Colton	Garrett	Jason	Blake	Blake
3	Clay	Blake	Wills	David	Leo	Garrett	Leo	Blake	Garrett	Jason	
4	Jean Blanc	Rickey	Chris	Jason	Colton	Jason	Garrett	Jason	Colton		
5	Connor	Jean Blanc	Jason	Wills	Blake	Wills	Blake	Wills			
6	Joe	Christon	John	Nick	Jason	Lincoln	Wills	Leo			
7	John	Clay	Clay	Christon	Connor	Leo	Connor; Lincoln				
8	Leo	Wills	Mike	Lincoln	Lincoln	Connor	Connor; Lincoln				
9	Jordan	Connor	Connor	Blake	John	Chris	Chris				
10	Rickey	Jason	Leo	Garrett	Chris	John					
11	Alex	John	David	Leo	David	Jordan					
12	Nick	Ryan	Garrett	John	Jordan	David					
13	Mike	Alex	Nick	Connor	Christon; Nick						
14	Garrett	Nick	Ryan	Jordan	Christon; Nick						
15	Blake	Trent	Christon	Jean Blanc	Jean Blanc						
16	Lincoln	Colton	Jordan	Mike; Ryan							
17	Chase	David	Lincoln	Mike; Ryan							
18	Darius	Jordan	Colton	Clay							
19	Ryan	Leo	Alex; Rickey; Trent								
20	Christon	Mike	Alex; Rickey; Trent								
21	Wills	Chris	Alex; Rickey; Trent								
22	Jason	Chase; Christian; Darius; Grant; Joe; Kamil									
23	Kamil	Chase; Christian; Darius; Grant; Joe; Kamil									
24	Jake	Chase; Christian; Darius; Grant; Joe; Kamil									
25	Trent	Chase; Christian; Darius; Grant; Joe; Kamil									
26	Christian	Chase; Christian; Darius; Grant; Joe; Kamil									
27	David	Chase; Christian; Darius; Grant; Joe; Kamil									
28	Chris	Jake									

The contestant received the first impression rose
The contestant received a rose during a date
The contestant received a rose during the cocktail party
The contestant was eliminated
The contestant was eliminated during a date
The contestant was eliminated outside the rose ceremony
The contestant received a rose during the date but quit the competition
The contestant won the competition

== Episodes ==
No. overall	No. in season	Title	Original release date	Prod. code	U.S. viewers (millions)	Rating/share (18–49)
146	1	"Week 1: Season Premiere"	May 28, 2018	1401	5.50	1.4/5
The season begins with Becca arriving at the Bachelor mansion to meet with three former Bachelorettes: Kaitlyn Bristowe, JoJo Fletcher, and Rachel Lindsay to give advice about finding love. JoJo burns sage to cleanse her memories. Later that night, Becca's journey begins when she meets twenty-eight men in the mansion. Colton brings a party popper to start things with a pop; Jean Blanc speaks French to Becca; Connor offers a ring and mimics a proposal with Becca's famous phrase, "Let's do the damn thing"; Mike holds a large cardboard of Arie Luyendyk Jr.; Garrett drives a minivan filled with diaper bags, car seats and a soccer ball; Becca recognizes Jake from Minnesota; Blake rides in on an ox; Trent appears out of a hearse; David wears a chicken suit; Chris presents a church choir group to sing a gospel song for Becca. Once they are all inside, Connor has the first conversation with Becca. Clay shows Becca a set of clay to help her remember his name. Christon, a former Harlem Globetrotter plays basketball with Becca and slam dunks by jumping over her head. Garrett takes Becca fishing in the swimming pool, and she is reminiscent of fishing with her dad while growing up. Becca recognizes Jake as someone she has met several times when she talks to him one-on-one, and because she does not trust his motives, she sends him home. Chris and Chase are acquainted and live in the same state, and Chris learns that one of Chase's ex-girlfriends doesn't believe he is on the show for the right reasons. Becca talks to both men to try and sort out the situation. Becca pulls Jake aside and sends him home because they have met in the past and he never showed interest in her. Garrett receives the first impression rose. At the rose ceremony, Chase, Christian, Darius, Grant, Joe, and Kamil were sent home.
147	2	"Week 2"	June 4, 2018	1402	5.81	1.6/7
Clay, Nick, Chris R., David, Jean Blanc, Jordan, Connor, and Lincoln are chosen for the first group date, and they travel to Saddlerock Ranch in Malibu to meet with Becca. She has them change into tuxedos, and they compete in a wedding-themed obstacle course hosted by Bachelorette couple Rachel Lindsay and Bryan Abasolo. Lincoln wins the challenge and takes a photo with Becca at the altar. At the after-party, Lincoln brings his picture frame and displays it in front of the other men. Connor feels that he is rubbing the victory in their faces. The argument escalates until Connor throws Lincoln's photo in the pool, smashing the glass. Lincoln tells Becca, and she in turn tells Connor she can't control their emotions. Connor then apologizes and hopes he can prove to her he isn't like that. Jean Blanc receives the group date rose. Immediately after the date, Colton and Jason gossip about the drama with Lincoln. Blake receives the first one-on-one date for the season, and he and Becca travel to an abandoned warehouse. Chris Harrison tells them they will be dealing with Becca's past from The Bachelor. They are shown various things recalling Becca's past with Arie such as a race car, champagne, a fish tank, a flock of hanging hearts, a dining room set, several TV monitors showing Arie's proposal to Becca, and the couch where Arie dumped her. Lil Jon appears and raps "Turn Down for What" while Becca and Blake destroy the items. During dinner, Blake reveals that he also has been blindsided by someone he loves. Becca feels a connection between them and Blake receives the rose. For the second group date, Garrett, Rickey, John, Ryan, Alex, Chris, Trent, Leo, Wills, and Colton go to a school gymnasium to play dodgeball with middle school kids. For the second part of the date, they split up into two teams of five in a trampoline stadium. Chris Harrison and Fred Willard provide commentary, and Leo shows exemplary dodgeball skills. At the after-party, Colton reveals to Becca that he had recently been talking to/dating Tia Booth from the most recent season of The Bachelor before coming on this show. Becca can't decide how she feels about the situation. Wills receives the group date rose. At the cocktail party, Jordan takes off most of his clothes, walks around to the other men, and comes to interrupt Becca and David's conversation. David is upset and claims that Jordan has disrespected him and Becca. Connor lets Becca throw a picture of him in the pool to get a fresh start. Becca and Colton talk again, and she makes it clear she still hasn't made up her mind. In the rose ceremony, Alex, Rickey, and Trent were sent home.
148	3	"Week 3"	June 11, 2018	1403	5.49	1.4/6
David and Jordan start the episode bickering, and drama continues to brew between them. Colton expresses his relief at receiving a rose and hopes his previous relationship with Tia will not hinder his relationship with Becca. Colton, along with Wills, Jason, Jordan, David, and Jean Blanc is selected for the group date to a spa with Becca's fellow The Bachelor contestants: Tia Booth, Caroline Lunny, Bekah Martinez, Seinne Fleming, and Kendall Long. The men "work" as spa attendants to pamper Becca and her friends; then it is the ladies' turn to pamper the men. Becca expresses her concerns to Tia about Colton. She is worried that he actually signed up for the show hoping that Tia would be chosen as the Bachelorette. At the after-party, Jordan reveals to the other men that he has 4,000 Tinder matches. David tells Becca about this, believing Jordan is not there for the right reasons. She expresses her anger to Jordan in front of the other men. Jordan fights with David over his intentions. Colton receives the group date rose. Chris goes on a one-on-one date, and he and Becca travel to Capitol Records studios where they meet singer-songwriter Richard Marx who asks them to write a love song about their relationship so far. Chris struggles to express his feelings. During the night portion of the date, Chris opens up about his family issues, and his parents' divorce then reveals that he wrote a letter to his estranged father that was never acknowledged. Chris receives the rose, and Marx serenades the couple with "Right Here Waiting". Suddenly, David is sent to the hospital. The next day, Chris Harrison tells Becca that David is in the intensive care unit with serious injuries after a fall from the top bunk of a bunk bed. The other men express concern. Clay, Leo, Christon, Ryan, John, Garrett, Mike, Lincoln, Connor, and Blake travel to Ventura College field grounds for a football game date called "The Becca Bowl". Legends Football League players Malissa Miles and Dina Karkowski coach the men in two teams of five, while Harrison and Keyshawn Johnson provide commentary. Clay leads his team to victory, but a bad fall causes him to be sent to the hospital. At the after-party, he joins the other men with a cast on his left arm, gives Becca a kiss, and receives the group date rose. During the cocktail party, Connor shows Becca how to play baseball. Then, Clay makes a difficult decision that he requires wrist surgery and therefore must leave the competition.
149	4	"Week 4: Park City, Utah"	June 18, 2018	1404	5.70	1.4/6
Picking up from the previous week's cocktail party, Becca gives Jordan a pair of gold boxer shorts as a joke. David returns to the mansion with a bruised face and eye after his fall off the top bunk bed and tells Becca how he is feeling. Becca gives him a rose during the cocktail party, so he can rest and skip the rose ceremony. At the rose ceremony, Mike and Ryan were sent home. Becca shortly announces to the remaining men that they are heading to Park City, Utah. Garrett goes on his one-on-one date with Becca to explore Park City, visiting shops on a busy street where they tried on alpaca hats and took kombucha shots. When they reach Utah Olympic Park via ski lift, Olympians Valerie Fleming and Shauna Rohbock are there to show them how to ride a bobsled. During dinner, Garrett tells Becca about his difficult past, revealing that he is a divorcee and that his ex-wife was emotionally abusive to him. Garrett receives the rose, and they attend a concert by Granger Smith. Jordan, Chris, Blake, Nick, John, Lincoln, Leo, David, Connor, Christon, Jason, Colton, and Jean Blanc go to Wasatch Mountain State Park for a group date where they meet with Becca to participate in a lumberjack competition called Becca's Big Lumberjack Bash. They meet with lumberjack experts Kendall and Billy who instruct the men on how to practice logging skills. They divide into two teams to create five events. Blake shows his outdoor experience and dominates competitions for Team Red, but Team Blue wins after John seals the victory. At the after-party, Jordan wears his gold boxer shorts as a joke, but it rubs Colton up the wrong way, and they argue about Jordan's immaturity. Jean Blanc gives Becca a present of a customized perfume for her, and they kiss. During Lincoln's alone time with Becca, Jean Blanc interrupts, asking for more time. Then, Jean Blanc tells her that he is falling in love with her, but Becca makes it clear that she doesn't feel the same way about him yet. While they are walking outside, Jean Blanc questions Becca's panic, and when she tells him she doesn't return his feelings of love, he takes back what he said. Becca feels he was only saying what he thought she wanted to hear, and Jean Blanc is sent home. The conversation with him upset Becca, and she warns the other men she demands honesty. The episode ends with no rose. Wills goes on his one-on-one date with Becca where they ride a snowmobile through Thousand Peaks Park. Wills shares his story with Becca that he had an emotional previous relationship and he receives the rose. The cocktail party is canceled, as Becca feels certain of what she wants to do; instead, there is a rose ceremony. Christon and Nick are sent home. Jordan stays and fears that he and David will continue fighting, and vows to make a strong move with Becca in the next week. Becca informs the men they are heading to Las Vegas.
150	5	"Week 5: Las Vegas"	June 25, 2018	1405	5.78	1.4/6
The twelve remaining men arrive in Las Vegas. Colton goes on his one-on-one date with Becca where they ride camels on a camel safari to a hot tub where they relax and kiss. Colton tells Becca he has moved on from his situation with Tia and also opens up about his previous relationship. He receives the rose. Wills, Garrett, Blake, John, Connor, Leo, Lincoln, Jason, and Chris travel to the Casa de Shenandoah estate where they meet with "Mr. Las Vegas" himself, Wayne Newton into his house. Newton brings his wife Kathleen to meet Becca and the men. Newton asks the men to write a song, changing the lyrics of his well-known song "Danke Schoen". Chris is excited about his song, which is similar to the one he composed during his one-on-one date in week three. The men have to perform on a stage with Newton and Becca herself. John has a positive attitude about his talent for singing. The after-party took place at T-Mobile Arena. There, Chris doesn't try to get time with Becca due to his high confidence in his singing performance. He ends up getting nothing when Becca spends a lot of time with Blake. Blake tells her that he is falling in love with her, and they share a passionate kiss. He receives the group date rose. David and Jordan get the two-on-one date and meet with Becca at Valley of Fire State Park. The two rivals are not very impressed. David tells Becca Jordan was looking at other women in the hotel and casino. Jordan talks to Becca about casinos in his past, but she confronts him over David's comments that Jordan said he was settling for Becca. When Jordan returns, he and David start a heated argument. Becca sends David home. During dinner, Jordan is pleased to talk about his modeling gigs, and Becca seeing she has no connection with him, sends Jordan home. At the cocktail party, Chris interrupts Becca and Wills' to discuss he feels she owes him more time, which Becca disagrees with. Wills returns a minute later and asks Chris to leave and let him continue his conversation with Becca. At the rose ceremony, John is eliminated. Afterward, Becca and the remaining men will travel to Richmond, Virginia.
151	6	"Week 6: Richmond, Virginia"	July 2, 2018	1406	5.30	1.2/6
The nine men travel to Richmond, Virginia for the week. Becca meets with Chris Harrison to debrief about the upcoming dates. Before the start of the first date, Chris and Lincoln start to bicker and have an argument. Jason received a one-on-one date to explore the sights of Downtown Richmond, including the historical landmarks (St. John's Episcopal Church and Edgar Allan Poe Museum). Jason and Becca stop by Veil Brewing Company, and Jason is surprised to see his friends there. During dinner, Jason shares the heartbreaking story of his grandmother who had Alzheimer's. Becca gives him the rose. Colton, Garrett, Wills, Connor, Blake, Lincoln, and Chris are taken for a group date, dressing in suits to visit the Virginia State Capitol to meet George Washington and Abraham Lincoln impersonators. There, the re-enactors announced the men will compete in a debate called "Beccalection". Harrison and Becca are the judges, along with the "Presidents". Virginia Governor Ralph Northam makes his appearance as an audience member. Chris was dishonest, and Lincoln called him "malicious and aggressive" in reference to their previous argument. Chris and Lincoln would continue to disagree. At the after-party, Becca asked the men to give up the drama. When Chris shows up to speak with Becca, he expressed having a few doubts and confronts Lincoln once again. Colton receives the group date rose. Leo attends his one-on-one date, where he and Becca flew on a private plane on an aerial tour of Virginia. They landed in Chesapeake where they saw hundreds of oysters around Chesapeake Bay to collect and shuck, he and Becca gave a toast on their foraged oysters. Dinner took place at Old City Hall, where Leo and Becca chatted together about his relationship with his father, with whom he is very close and idolized as a child. Leo received the rose and attended a public concert at Carpenter Theatre with Morgan Evans performing his single "Kiss Somebody" on a stage. Shortly after the date, Chris came to visit Becca, and he shows isn't happy. He talks to her in her hotel room, and Becca confronts him about his erratic and manipulative behavior, which had a tendency to cause issues. Ultimately, Becca sent him home. The remaining men were prepared for the planned cocktail party at Dover Hall, but Harrison announced it would be canceled in favor of the rose ceremony. At the ceremony, Connor and Lincoln were sent home. Then, Becca announced the remaining men were going to The Bahamas.
152	7	"Week 7: The Bahamas"	July 9, 2018	1407	5.68	1.4/6
After the men arrive at Baha Mar hotel in Nassau, Becca has a one-on-one talk with Chris Harrison before usual pre-date activities. Colton goes on his one-on-one date, where he and Becca are seen riding through a catamaran to meet a local man waiting on a boat, where they will collect a mollusk from the ocean below. Colton tells her about his experiences in an athletic environment and reveals to Becca that he is a virgin. Becca briefly leaves the dinner to collect her thoughts but ultimately gives Colton the rose. Garrett receives the second one-on-one date, riding a seaplane with Becca to explore The Bahamas. Back at the hotel, Blake is starting to worry about the amount of time that has passed since his last one-on-one date. Garrett expresses his feelings to Becca, and he explains to her she is what he is looking for in a partner; Garrett receives the rose. Blake receives the final one-on-one date, where he and Becca listen to various songs from The Baha Men and dance together. Then, they talk on the beach where Blake reveals that his parents divorced while he was in high school as a result of his mother's affair with his high school football coach. Blake also expresses that he is nervous and anxious because of the other men in the competition. Becca reassures him and gives him a rose. Wills, Jason, and Leo go on the group date where they ride on a boat to a private island and play a volleyball game with Becca. Becca talks with Leo, who is anxious about his connection with Becca. They both have different futures envisioned; Becca sends him home and takes Wills and Jason to dinner. Becca ultimately decides that she has a stronger connection with Jason and gives him the group date rose, sending Wills home in tears.
153	8	"Week 8: Hometowns"	July 16, 2018	1408	6.31	1.6/7
Becca visits Garrett's hometown of Manteca, California to visit his family's farm, where they plant tomatoes in a muddy field. Garrett plants a rose bush for Becca. Becca shares her concerns about meeting his family, given his previous relationship's failure. Then, Becca meets Garrett's family. He is very close with his older sister, and she shares her opinions about his previous relationship. Next, Becca goes to Jason's hometown of Buffalo, New York. They traveled to Anchor Bar to eat a platter of buffalo wings, afterward playing hockey together at Harborcenter. Jason reflects on his brother marrying a male partner and how that would affect his thoughts on marriage. Jason's mother talks with Becca about the courage of her son's relationship. Then, Becca joins Blake in his hometown of Bailey, Colorado, where he takes Becca to his old high school, Platte Canyon High School. He gives her a tour of the school, including the school's track and field, and they see his high school picture posted on a wall. Blake tells Becca about a school shooting that happened while he was attending high school and how the event has shaped his views toward life. Then, Betty Who performs in the school auditorium. Later, Becca meets Blake's family, and his mother states he is deeply in love with Becca. Finally, in Parker, Colorado Becca sees Colton, and they go to the Children's Hospital Colorado in Aurora volunteering to spend time with two children with cystic fibrosis. When Becca meets Colton's large family, he tells his mother about his virginity, and Colton's father raises concern that his resolve would be tested. In Los Angeles, Becca reunites with her old friends from The Bachelor to give them a rundown of each the visits. Tia asks Becca to sit down one-on-one with Becca to talk about the fact that she still has feelings for Colton. At the start of the rose ceremony, Colton asks Chris Harrison about the Fantasy Suites and what they entail; then Becca eliminates him. Becca announces the remaining men will be going to Chiang Mai, Thailand.
154	9	"Week 9: Fantasy Suites"	July 23, 2018	1409	5.91	1.4/6
Becca and the three remaining men arrive in Chiang Mai for the overnight dates. Blake's one-on-one date started with a hike on the steps of a Buddhist temple. When they reach it, they ring the temple's bell and are blessed by Buddhist monks who tell the importance of honesty and patience in a better relationship. Blake recounts his past relationship to Becca and receives an invitation to the fantasy suite. For Jason's one-on-one date, he and Becca explore landmarks in the city, especially the Sunday market where they eat crickets from a street food stall. When they are in a temple, Becca makes a statement about the future, then wants to take it back. During Becca's confessional, she begins to question her future with Jason. During dinner, Jason tells Becca that his family approves of her, then asks Becca how she is feeling. Becca walks away to collect her thoughts. When she returns, she tells Jason that his relationship with her isn't as far along as Blake and Garrett's. Jason is not offered the fantasy suite card, and Becca walks him out. Then, Becca begins to sob, reminded of her past heartbreak with Arie during The Bachelor. During Garrett's one-on-one date, he and Becca ride on a bamboo raft down a river. Becca questions Garrett about his love life and his preparation for another engagement. He tells Becca his family loved her during the hometown date. Garrett receives the fantasy suite invitation as well. On the day of the rose ceremony, Jason walks to see Becca in her hotel room, and she is anxiously surprised. They talk, and he presents her with a scrapbook before leaving. Garrett and Blake receive roses during the ceremony.
155	10	"The Men Tell All"	July 30, 2018	N/A	5.47	1.3/5
The seventeen eliminated men are in the audience, and several of the contestants spoke of their lives after the competition. Jordan begins to make an accusation and the men bicker. Christian confronts him and insulted Kamil. Joe, who was eliminated on night one, became very popular since the show and is considered a fan favorite. He tells them he is still single and announces he will appear on Bachelor in Paradise. Colton detailed the time he spent with Tia before The Bachelor was aired, that they have not spoken since his elimination from the show, and that he told Chris Harrison about his virginity. Jason goes on to say he had a good conversation with his brother that would make him a better supporter of the LGBT community. Becca later joins with the men to discuss issues she is dealing with. Chris speaks to her about his shocking exit in Richmond and Becca offers him an apology where the church gospel choir surprises the audience with a song.
156	11	"Week 10: Season Finale & After the Final Rose"	August 6, 2018	1410	6.71	1.8/9
The final two contestants have an opportunity to meet with Becca's family on Villingili island in Maldives. Both men impress her family. Becca's sister points out it feels like she has known Garrett for much longer, as he is very open and welcoming. Blake charms the family as well. On the final individual dates, Garrett takes on a boat ride with Becca around in the middle of the Indian Ocean straddling the Equator. They swim together under the sea with dolphins and expressed their feelings. Becca wondered if her father would be proud of him as a perfect husband. Blake surprised Becca with a bike ride across the island, and they end with a dip on a beach. Blake presents a second scrapbook as a callback to how they started the journey. Becca's sister writes her a letter letting her know how proud she is of Becca and tells her to follow her heart. At this point, Becca has made her decision of who would get the final rose. The first out of the boat is Blake. Blake begins to tell Becca how much he loves her and that he wants to spend his life with her. Becca stops him and lets him know that it is over. They say their goodbyes and Blake then begins to cry. When Garrett comes to the beach, he proposes to Becca on one knee, and Becca accepts his proposal. Becca tells Garrett she loves him and is in love with him. The engaged couple makes a public appearance, speaking about how they're taking to the next step towards starting their lives together. Chris gives a pre-honeymoon gift with a surprise return trip to Thailand. Before leaving, Becca and Garrett received a free Costco business card for their first date as an engaged couple, and they also received a gift of a minivan outside the studio.

== Controversies ==
=== Garrett Yrigoyen Instagram likes ===
The show came under fire when it was revealed that Garrett Yrigoyen, who was the recipient of the "First Impression" rose and the eventual winner, had liked various controversial Instagram posts. He later apologized and stated that he will be more mindful of what he likes in the future as those likes "were not a true reflection of [him] or [his morals]".

=== Lincoln Adim sexual misconduct charges ===
On June 13, 2018, the show came under more fire for allowing contestant Lincoln Adim to participate in the show after he had been charged with groping and assaulting a woman on a harbor cruise ship on May 30, 2016. Adim was convicted of this crime after he finished filming and one week before the season premiered. Adim will be registered as a sex offender. Warner Bros., who produces the show, claim that Adim lied about facing sexual misconduct charges and that they use a third-party company to conduct background checks, claiming:

The report we received did not reference any incident or charge relating to the recent conviction ― or any other charges relating to sexual misconduct. We are currently investigating why the report did not contain this information, which we will share when we have it.

=== Colton Underwood drama ===
In January 2018, before being cast for The Bachelorette, Underwood had a brief relationship with The Bachelor season 22 contestant, Tia Booth. Kufrin was made aware of the relationship early in the season, but after Underwood received a hometown date, Booth came back and told Kufrin that she still had feelings for him. Underwood was then eliminated.

During Underwood's hometown date, he revealed to Kufrin that she was the first girl he has brought home to meet his family. This was later proven to be untrue as fans of the show found old pictures of Underwood's ex-girlfriend, Aly Raisman, at his home with his family.

After Underwood disclosed to Kufrin that he was a virgin, Wendy Williams commented on her show that she "[doesn't] trust people that have never had a drink, a smoke, and [she doesn't] trust people that have never had sex". Williams received criticism from some fans, saying she humiliated Underwood and that "virgin-shaming" was not okay. Underwood responded to Williams on Twitter by stating "Don't trust a virgin, but you'll trust your 3 baby daddies who cheat on you every weekend. Okay".
