= Barbara Fister =

American novelist

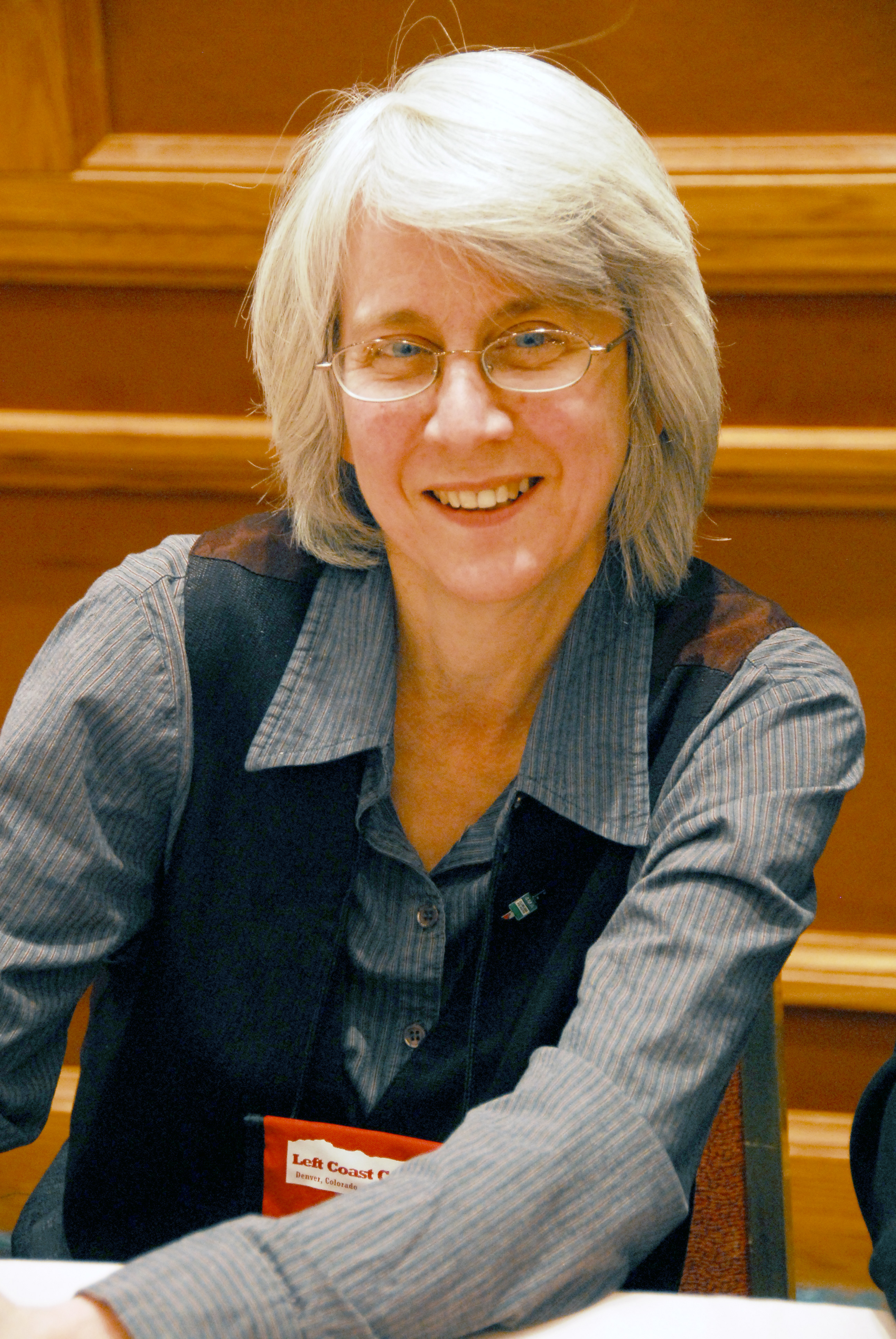
- Born: 1954 (age 71–72); Madison, Wisconsin, U.S.
- Education: University of Kentucky (BA); University of Texas at Austin (MLIS); Minnesota State University, Mankato (MA)
- Occupations: Librarian, author
- Writing career
- Language: English

Barbara Fister (born 1954) is an American author, blogger, librarian, best known for her writing about libraries and the role they play in student learning. She is a frequent contributor to Library Babel Fish for Inside Higher Ed as well as ACRLog, a blog by and for academic and research librarians.

== Life and career ==
Fister was born in Madison, Wisconsin, in 1954 to Bruce and Rosemary Westley. She married William T. Fister in 1975, and earned her B.A. degree from the University of Kentucky the following year. She went on to receive her M.L.I.S. from the University of Texas at Austin in 1981, and her M.A. in English Literature from Minnesota State University, Mankato in 1992. Fister was an academic librarian and professor at Gustavus Adolphus College, and now holds the rank of Professor Emerita. She is a Project Information Literacy Scholar in Residence. She has two children, Timothy and Rosemary.

== Selected works ==
=== Reference works ===
- Third World Women's Literatures: A Dictionary and Guide to Materials in English (Greenwood Press, 1995)
- (With Diana Hacker) Research and Documentation in the Electronic Age (St. Martin's, 2010)

=== Novels ===
- Through the Cracks (Minotaur, 2010)
- In the Wind (Minotaur, 2008)
- On Edge (Dell, 2002)

=== Articles and essays ===
- "Principled Uncertainty: Why Learning to Ask Good Questions Matters More Than Finding Answers." Project Information Literacy Provocation Series 2.1 (February 16, 2022).
- "Reading, Risk, and Reality: Undergraduates and Reading for Pleasure," with Julie Gilbert, College and Research Libraries 72.5 (September 2011): 474–495.
- "'Reading as a Contact Sport': Online Book Groups and the Social Dimensions of Reading." Reference and User Services Quarterly, 44.4 (Summer 2005): 303–309.
- "Copycat Crimes: Crime Fiction and the Marketplace of Anxieties." Clues: A Journal of Detection 23.3 (Spring 2005): 43–56.
- "Teaching the Rhetorical Dimensions of Research." Research Strategies 11.4 (Fall 1993):211–219.
