= Ross Atkinson =

American librarian and scholar (1945–2006)

Ross W. Atkinson (1945 – March 8, 2006) was an American librarian and scholar.

== Life and career ==
Atkinson worked at Northwestern University from 1977 until 1983 when he left to become an assistant university librarian for collection development at the University of Iowa. In 1988, he moved to Cornell University where he worked until his death, serving as associate librarian for collections and later deputy university librarian.

At Cornell, he was notable for developing digital online collections and advocating for new paradigms of open access scholarly publishing, helping to convene the influential 2005 Janus Conference on Research Library Collections.

He was active in the American Library Association and its divisions, the Coalition for Networked Information, the Committee on Institutional Cooperation, the Research Libraries Group, and the Digital Library Federation.

Atkinson was named the 2003 Academic/Research Librarian of the Year by the Association of College and Research Libraries (ACRL), a division of the American Library Association (ALA). Per Sarah Thomas, "his body of scholarly and theoretical writing on collection management and scholarly communication is among the most influential and thought-provoking appearing in this field."

His collected writings were published by the Association for Library Collections & Technical Services (ALCTS) in 2005. The Ross Atkinson Lifetime Achievement Award was established in 2007 by ALCTS.

== Selected Publications ==
- Atkinson, Ross (1989). "The Role of Abstraction in Bibliography and Collection Development". Libri. 39 (3): 201–216. doi:10.1515/libr.1989.39.3.201.
- Atkinson, Ross (January 1992). "The Acquisitions Librarian as Change Agent in the Transition to the Electronic Library". Library Resources & Technical Services. 36 (1): 7–20.
- Atkinson, Ross (1993). "Crisis and Opportunity: Reevaluating Acquisitions Budgeting in an Age of Transition". Journal of Library Administration. 19 (2): 33–55.
- Atkinson, Ross (July 1996). "Library Functions, Scholarly Communication, and the Foundation of the Digital Library: Laying Claim to the Control Zone". The Library Quarterly. 66 (3): 239–263. doi:10.1086/602884.
- Atkinson, Ross (2001). "Contingency and Contradiction: The Place(s) of the Library at the Dawn of the New Millennium". Journal of the American Society for Information Science and Technology. 52 (1): 3–11. doi:10.1002/1532-2890(2000)52:1<3::AID-ASI1051>3.0.CO;2-R.
- Atkinson, Ross (October 2006). "Six Key Challenges for the Future of Collection Development". Library Resources & Technical Services. 50 (4): 244–251. doi:10.5860/lrts.50n4.244.
