= Periodicals librarian =

Librarian who works in the specialized area of periodical literature

A periodicals librarian or serials librarian is a librarian who works in the specialized area of periodical literature. A periodicals librarian can have a variety of duties, but generally work specifically with the acquisition, collection development, organization, preservation, and sometimes cataloging of periodicals. Whereas many periodicals librarians previously worked only with periodicals in print format, many now manage electronic periodicals also. While a periodicals librarians may work in any type of library, including academic, public, government, law, medical, or corporate libraries, a significant number work in larger public and academic libraries. In other libraries where there is no librarian assigned specifically to periodicals, one or more librarians may perform the duties of a periodicals librarian along with other duties.

== Roles and duties ==
The duties of a periodicals librarian are changing as technology and the needs of library patrons change. The duties may include, but are not limited to, establishing and maintaining subscriptions to periodicals in print, microform, and electronic formats; providing personal assistance and guidance in identifying, locating, and using periodicals; designing and conducting instructional sessions on how to use electronic journals and databases; evaluating the existing periodicals collection by performing collection analysis and usage studies; creating activities, programs, or presentations to promote the periodicals collection; establishing and maintaining contact with faculty, students, or other constituents to be sure the periodicals collection is meeting their needs; assisting and instructing faculty of a college, university, or school on the integrating of periodicals into the curriculum; supervising and developing student workers and support staff; managing budget allocations for materials, systems, and services; physical repair of periodicals; supervising paraprofessional staff, other librarians, and student workers (Kane, 74–75).

Advances in technology have significantly advanced the way that periodicals departments in libraries function. For example, open url resolvers, systems which allow a libraries to give greater visibility and access to their electronic journal content. Many libraries have gone to electronic-only subscriptions on some periodicals, significantly expanding access for their patrons. Periodicals librarians frequently set up access to electronic journals and other electronic resources, as well as to troubleshoot them when they do not work properly (Davis, 149).

== Education ==
In most western nations, a periodicals librarian must have a master's degree in library science to work in an academic or public library. Generally, the master's degree takes one to two years to complete. Many academic and public libraries in the United States require a master's degree from a school of library science accredited by the American Library Association. Librarians working for the federal government are often required to have a master's degree in library or an equivalent in education and experience. Some may have additional degrees in a subject area (Kane, 75).
