= Judith Kuster =

Judith Maginnis Kuster, a.k.a. Judith A. Kuster, is a certified speech-language pathologist and Professor Emerita from Minnesota State University, Mankato where she taught in the Department of Speech, Hearing and Rehabilitation Services for 25 years. She holds an MS in speech-language pathology from the University of Wisconsin, Madison and an MS in counseling from Minnesota State University, Mankato. She is an ASHA FELLOW and a Board Recognized Specialist in Fluency BRSF-R.

Kuster created and maintains the Stuttering Home Page, a guide and resources for professionals, adults and children about the treatment of stuttering, cluttering, and other communication disorders. She has been invited to give presentations about resources for the treatment of communications disorders North America, Europe, China, and Korea

Kuster organized and chaired ISAD Conference from 1998-2012. ISAD is held on a yearly basis, for the three weeks before International Stuttering Awareness Day, every year. International Stuttering Awareness Day is October 22. This conference is free and available world-wide, connecting professionals (Speech-language pathologists and researchers) with consumers (people who stutter and their families). She also organized an International Cluttering Association online conference ( in 2010.

She has published many articles focused on speech-language pathology for the American Speech-Language-Hearing Association, Advance for Speech-Language Pathologists and Audiologists, the Journal of School Health, the Journal of Medical Speech-Language Pathology, The Clinical Connection, Speaking Out, and other journals.

Kuster lives in New Ulm, Minnesota with her husband Thomas Kuster.

== ISAD Conferences ==
The ISAD Conference is a yearly event and copies of the entire conference from 1998-2026 are archived. Kuster has hosted the conference every year from 1998 to 2012.

- 2012, ISAD 15, A Voice and Something to Say
- 2011, ISAD 14, Sharing Stories - Changing Perceptions
- 2010, ISAD 13, People Who Stutter, INSPIRE!
- 2009, ISAD 12, STUTTERING: More Than a Tangled Tongue
- 2008, ISAD 11, Don't Be Afraid of Stuttering
- 2007, ISAD 10, Stuttering Awareness: Global Community, Local Activity
- 2006, ISAD 9, Don't Talk About Us, Talk With Us
- 2005, ISAD 8, Community Vision for Global Action
- 2004, ISAD 7, International Year of the Child Who Stutters
- 2003, ISAD 6, International Stuttering Awareness is Everyday
- 2002, ISAD 5, Don't Let Stuttering Stop You
- 2001, ISAD 4, You Are Not Alone
- 2000, ISAD 3, Reach Out to Children Who Stutter
- 1999, ISAD 2, Many Languages, One Voice
- 1998, ISAD 1, The Power of Your Voice
