= Nancy Wicker =

American art historian

Nancy L. Wicker is Distinguished Professor of art history at the University of Mississippi. She was previously professor in the department of art at Minnesota State University, Mankato.

== Career ==
Wicker graduated BA with High Honors from Eastern Illinois University, majoring in art history and studio art, in 1975. She took her MA in art history from the University of Minnesota in 1979, followed by her Ph.D. also from Minnesota in 1990, with work on interdisciplinary art history, archaeology, and Germanic philology.

She was appointed an assistant professor in the department of art at Minnesota State University, Mankato, in 1990, promoted to associate professor in 1995, and then professor in 2000. Since 2003 she has been professor of art history at the University of Mississippi, where she was named Distinguished Professor in 2024. In 2009, she was visiting professor at Uppsala University.

She has served scholarly societies on the Board of Directors of the International Center of Medieval Art (2003–2006, 2023–2026). as a Councillor of the Medieval Academy of America (2009–2012), on the Advisory Board of the Society for the Advancement of Scandinavian Study (2001–2005).

Wicker is a specialist in the function of jewellery in the early medieval period in Europe and gender and archaeology about which she has edited three books, including Gender and the Archaeology of Death (2001).

She has participated in archaeological excavations in the U.S., Germany, and Sweden, in particular during the 1990–1995 excavations in the "black earth" at Birka, Björkö, Sweden, a UNESCO Heritage Site.

== Fellowships ==
2023–2024, Solmsen Fellowship from the Institute for Research in the Humanities, in residence at the University of Wisconsin-Madison.

2016–2017, Allen W. Clowes Fellowship from the National Humanities Center, in residence at Research Triangle, North Carolina.

2009–2010, American Council of Learned Societies Fellowship.

2001–2002, National Endowment for the Humanities Fellowship (FT-37154-01).

== Grants ==
2022–2023, Samuel Hl. Kress Foundation, Digital Art History Grant, "Andvari Iconographic Thesaurus," Co-Director, with Lilla Kopár (The Catholic University of America); Principal Investigator, Worthy Martin (University of Virginia, Institute for Advanced Technology in the Humanities).

2016–2018, National Endowment for the Humanities, Digital Humanities Start-up Grant, Level II, “Project Andvari: A Digital Portal to the Visual World of Early Medieval Northern Europe” (HD-248511-16). Co-Director, with Lilla Kopár; Principal Investigator, Worthy Martin.

2013–2014, National Endowment for the Humanities, Digital Humanities Start-up Grant, Level I, “Project Andvari: A Digital Portal to the Visual World of Early Medieval Northern Europe” (HD-51640-13). Co-Director, with Lilla Kopár.

2011–2013, “The Arts of Rome’s Provinces,” Connecting Art Histories Initiative, Getty Foundation Research Seminar: Great Britain (2011), Greece (2012), and The Getty Villa, Los Angeles (2013).

2000 National Endowment for the Humanities Summer Stipend (FT-44837-00).

== Selected publications ==
=== Books ===
- Situating Gender in European Archaeologies. Archaeolingua Press, 2010. (Editor with Live Helga Dommasnes, Tove Hjørungdal, Sandra Montón Subías, and Margarita Sánchez Romero) ISBN 978-963-9911-15-4
- Gender and the archaeology of death. AltaMira Press, 2001. (Editor with Bettina Arnold) ISBN 0759101361
- From the ground up: Beyond gender theory in archaeology: proceedings of the Fifth Gender and Archaeology Conference, University of Wisconsin-Milwaukee, October 1998. Archaeopress, Oxford, 1999. (Editor with Bettina Arnold) (British Archaeological Reports) ISBN 1841710253

=== Articles and contributions to edited books ===
- "The Kymbo Figurine: An Unidentified Deity,” pp. 28–29 in Fragment av föremål, platser, kroppar och ord. En vänbok tillägnad Torun Zachrisson, edited by Charlotte Hedenstierna-Jonson, Anna Kjellström, Cecelia Ljung, and Linda Qviström. Occasional Papers in Archaeology 89. Upplandsmuseets skriftserie 15.Uppsala: Upplandsmuseet och Uppsala universitetet, Institutionen för arkeologi, antik historia och kulturvård, 2025.
- “Changes in Imagery and Artistic Techniques from the Early to Late Iron Age in Scandinavia,” pp. 209–222 in Change. The Shift from the Early to Late Scandinavian Iron Age in the First Millennium AD, edited by Torun Zachrisson and Svante Fischer. Neue Studien zur Sachsenforschung 13, edited by Babette Ludowici. Uppsala: Stiftelsen Upplandsmuseet, 2024.
- “Cross-cultural Interaction in Animal-style and Figurative Art of the Vikings,” pp. 43–73 in The Medieval Scandinavian Art Reader, edited by Margarethe C. Stang and Laura Tillery. Oslo: Scandinavian University Press, 2023.
- “Bracteates and Beverages: An Image from Scalford (and Hoby) and the Inscription alu.” pp. 127–141, in Reading Runes. The 8th International Symposium on Runes and Runic Inscriptions, edited by Mindy MacLeod, Marco Bianchi, and Henrik Williams. Runrön: Runologiska bidrag 24. Uppsala: Uppsala University, 2021.
- “New Investigations of Migration Period Scandinavian Gold Bracteates Illuminate Old Finds, and Modern Technologies Reveal New Discoveries,” pp. 409–413 in Aleksanderia: Studies on Items, Ideas and History Dedicated to Professor Aleksander Bursche on the Occasion of His 65th Birthday, edited by Roksana Chowaniec and Renata Ciołek. Wiesbaden: Harrassowitz Verlag, 2021. ISBN 978-3-447-11554-4
- “Dazzle, Dangle, and Jangle: Sensory Effects of Scandinavian Gold Bracteates,” Special Issue/Themenheft: “Getting the Sense(s) of Small Things/Sinn und Sinnlichkeit kleiner Dinge,” Das Mittelalter: Perspektiven mediävistischer Forschung 25:2 (2020): 358–381.
- “Humans and Animals: The Changing Corpus of Danish Viking Art,” pp. 413–425 in Viking Encounters: Proceedings of the 18th Viking Congress, Denmark, August 6–12, 2017, edited by Anne Pedersen and Søren M. Sindbæk. Aarhus: Aarhus University Press. ISBN 978-87-7184-265-4
- “The Scandinavian Container at San Isidoro, León, in the Context of Viking Art and Society,” 223–248 in The Medieval Iberian Treasury in the Context of Cultural Interchange (Expanded Edition), edited by Therese Martin. Leiden: Brill, 2020.
- “Thuringian Links to Jutland and Western Norway as Reflected in Scandinavian-type Migration Period Bracteates—A Family Affair?” pp. 155–165 in Sächsische Leute und Länder. The Naming and Localising of Group-Identities in the First Millennium AD, edited by Melanie Augstein and Matthias Hardt. Neue Studien zur Sachsenforschung 10. Wendeburg, Germany: Braunschweigischen Landesmuseum, Internationalen Sachsensymposion, 2019. ISBN 978-3-932030-84-0
- “Mapping Gold in Motion: Women and Jewelry from Early Medieval Scandinavia,” pp. 13–32 in Moving Women, Moving Objects (400–1500), edited by Tracy Chapman Hamilton and Mariah Proctor-Tiffany. Maps, Spaces, Cultures 2. Leiden: Brill, 2019.
- “Bridging the Gap: Managing a Digital Medieval Initiative Across Disciplines and Institutions,” with Joseph Koivisto and Lilla Kopár, pp. 223–240 in Meeting the Medieval in a Digital World, edited by Mathew Evan Davis, Tamsyn Mahoney-Steel and Ece Turnator. Medieval Media Cultures. Leeds: ARC Medieval Press/Medieval Institute Publications, 2018. ISBN 978-1641891929, ISBN 978-1641891936
- “Decolonizing Gold Bracteates: From Late Roman Medallions to Scandinavian Migration Period Pendants,” pp. 17–36 in Postcolonising the Medieval Image, edited by Eva Frojmovic and Catherine Karkov. London: Routledge (Taylor & Francis), 2017. ISBN 978-1-4724-8166-5
- “The Reception of Figurative Art beyond the Frontier: Scandinavian Encounters with Roman Numismatic Imagery,” pp. 243–256 in Rome and the Worlds Beyond Roman Frontiers: The Eleventh Workshop of the International Network Impact of Empire, edited by Danielle Slootjes and Michael Peachin. Impact of Empire 21. Leiden: Brill, 2016. ISBN 978-9004325616
- “Women in the Roman Iron Age (A.D. 0–400) in Scandinavia,” pp. 1027–1036 in Women in Antiquity: Real Women Across the Ancient World, edited by Stephanie Lynn Budin and Jean MacIntosh Turfa. Rewriting Antiquity. London: Routledge, 2016. ISBN 978-1-315-62142-5
- “Roman Medallions in Scandinavia: Shifting Contexts of Space, Time, and Meaning,” pp. 232–247 in Beyond Boundaries: Connecting Visual Cultures in the Roman Provinces, edited by Susan Alcock, Mariana Egri, and James F. D. Frakes. Los Angeles: Getty Publications, 2016. ISBN 978-1606064719
- “Bracteate Inscriptions and Context Analysis in the Light of Alternatives to Hauck’s Iconographic Interpretations,” Futhark: International Journal of Runic Studies 5, 2014 (2015): 25–43. ISSN 1892-0950
- “Inspiring the Barbarians? The Transformation from Roman Medallions to Scandinavian Bracteates,” pp. 105–120 in Rome Beyond the Imperial Frontiers: Imports, Attitudes, and Practices (Journal of Roman Archaeology Supplementary Series 94), edited by Peter S. Wells. Portsmouth RI: Journal of Roman Archaeology, 2013. ISBN 978-1-887829-94-6, ISBN 1-887829-94-6
- “Bracteates and Runes,” with Henrik Williams, Futhark: International Journal of Runic Studies 3, 2012 (2013): 151–213. ISSN 1892-0950
- “The Elusive Smith,” pp. 29–36 in Goldsmith Mysteries: Archaeological, Pictorial and Documentary Evidence from the 1st Millennium AD in Northern Europe (Schriften des Archäologischen Landesmuseums, Ergänzungsreihe 8), edited by Alexandra Pesch and Ruth Blankenfeldt. Neumünster: Wachholtz, 2012. ISBN 978 3 529 01878 7
- “Nimble-fingered Maidens in Scandinavia: Women as Artists and Patrons,” pp. 865–902 in Reassessing Women’s Roles as ‘Makers’ of Medieval Art and Architecture, vol. 2, edited by Therèse Martin. Leiden: Brill, 2012. ISBN 978 90 04 18555 5 (print), ISBN 978 90 04 22832 0 (e-book)
- “Christianization, Female Infanticide, and the Abundance of Female Burials at Viking Age Birka in Sweden,” Journal of the History of Sexuality 21:2 (2012): 245–262. ISSN 1043-4070
- “‘The Four Smiths’ and the Replication of Bracteate Techniques,” pp. 33–44 in Det 61. Internationale Sachsensymposion 2010 in Haderslev, Danmark(Arkæologi i Slesvig/Archäologie in Schleswig, Sonderband) edited by Linda Boye et al., Neumünster: Wachholtz, 2011. ISSN 0909-0533, ISBN 978-3-529-01899-2 (Wachholtz Verlag)
- “Would There Have Been Gothic Art without the Vikings? The Contribution of Scandinavian Medieval Art,” Medieval Encounters 17 (2011): 198–229. ISSN 1380-7854 (print), ISSN 1570-0674 (online). Reprinted as pp. 198–229 in Confronting the Borders of Medieval Art, edited by Jill Caskey, Adam S. Cohen, and Linda Safran. Leiden: Brill, 2011. ISBN 978 90 04 20749 3
- "The Scandinavian Animal Styles in Response to Mediterranean and Christian Narrative Art", at pp. 531–550 in The Cross Goes North: Processes of Conversion in Northern Europe, AD 300-1300, edited by Martin Carver. York: York Medieval Press, University of York, 2003, ISBN 978-0-631-22492-1
