= Association for Library Collections and Technical Services =

Former division of the American Library Association

- Formation: 1957
- Headquarters: Chicago, Illinois, United States
- Website: Association for Library Collections and Technical Services

The Association for Library Collections and Technical Services (ALCTS) was a division of the American Library Association (ALA) dedicated to the areas of technical services (acquisitions, cataloging and classification, and continuing resources), collection management and development, and preservation and reformatting. ALCTS membership represented over forty countries and included librarians, library support staff, students of library and information science, and commercial vendors whose professional interests lay in these areas of practice. ALCTS met the needs of its members through educational programming, publications, professional development opportunities and information exchange. ALCTS also promoted and had significant input into the development of standards and best practices, including NISO standards and cataloging standards such as RDA.

ALCTS was dissolved in 2020 and merged into a new ALA division, Core.

== History and organizational structure ==
ALCTS (pronounced uh-lex) was one of several ALA divisions created in 1957, upon the merger of several ALA units related to technical services. The division was originally known as the Resources and Technical Services Division (RTSD). The original four sections of the division were Acquisitions, Cataloging and Classification, Copying Methods, and Serials. The most recent name of the division was the result of a 1989 division membership vote.

ALCTS consisted of five sections: Acquisitions; Cataloging and Metadata Management; Collection Management; Preservation and Reformatting; and Continuing Resources.

The Acquisitions (AS) and Collection Management (CMS) Sections emerged over time from the original AS. The Cataloging and Metadata Management Section (CaMMS) had the longest history, having begun as a section of ALA in 1900. The Preservation and Reformatting Section (PARS) was a result of a 1994 merger of the Reproduction of Library Materials Section (which started as the Copying Methods Section) and the Preservation of Library Materials Section (which was created in 1980). The Continuing Resources Section (CRS) started as a round table of ALA in 1929, and was renamed in 2007.

The work of these sections, as well as the entire division, was supported through regular committee meetings. ALCTS also made available to its sections online options for communication and collaboration, including discussion lists, online communities, and wikis.

These sections were joined by the Affiliate Relations Committee (ARC) which replaced the Council of Regional Groups (CRG) in 2011. The role of ARC was to maintain contact with groups similar to ALCTS that serve specific geographic regions, and they hosted an Affiliates Showcase at the ALA Annual conference.

== Publications ==
ALCTS created and maintained a wide variety of publications that provided guidelines and policies for the work of its constituents; served as educational resources, and kept the membership informed of current developments and trends with the division and the profession. The guidelines and policy documents were often used in an advisory role for technical services, collection development, and preservation decisions. The division also published a series of books (ALCTS Monographs). ALCTS published two serials – ALCTS News, which reports on the happenings of the division and the people within it; and Library Resources and Technical Services (LRTS), a quarterly, peer-reviewed journal.

== Programming ==
At the ALA Annual Conference, ALCTS sponsored programming both at the division level and through its sections. At the ALA Midwinter Meeting, ALCTS hosted a forum on a major topic of interest to its constituency. At both annual events, ALCTS sponsored symposia and preconference workshops that went in depth on specific concepts. Both events also featured interest groups (many of which were formerly discussion groups). The IGs were not official programs, but they allowed people working or interested in specific roles to gather for discussion and/or plan future programming. Outside of conferences, ALCTS also offered online educational opportunities and a series of online discussions via discussion groups.

ALCTS sponsored the annual Preservation Week program. ALA encourages libraries and other institutions to use Preservation Week to connect communities through events, activities, and resources that highlight what can be done, individually and together, to preserve personal and shared collections.

== Awards ==
Each year, ALCTS honored people in librarianship working in acquisitions, continuing resources, cataloging, collection development, and preservation through more than a dozen awards. Juries consisting mostly of ALCTS member volunteers (who were generally peers of potential recipients) selected recipients of these awards:

- Writing/Publishing: Edward Swanson Memorial Best of LRTS Award; Outstanding Publication Award
- Innovation: Outstanding Collaboration Citation; ProQuest Coutts Award for Innovation
- Personal Achievement: Ross Atkinson Lifetime Achievement Award; Hugh C. Atkinson Memorial Award; Paul Banks and Carolyn Harris Preservation Award; George Cunha and Susan Swartzburg Award; Esther J. Piercy Award; Margaret Mann Citation
- Leadership in Library Acquisitions Award (acquisitions); Ulrich’s Serials Librarianship Award (continuing resources); Presidential Citation (special service to ALCTS)
- Achievement for Newer Professionals: First Step Award
- For Professionals in Developing Countries: Online Course Grant

== See also ==
- Cataloging
- Collection development
- Library acquisitions
- Library technical services
- List of libraries in the United States
- Periodicals (or serials) librarians
- Preservation (library and archival science)
