= Library technical services =

Library technical services are the ongoing maintenance activities of a library's collection, including the three broad areas of collection development, cataloging, and processing. Technical services are the infrastructure that enable the user's experience of many library services and are typically performed "behind the scenes."

== Collection development ==
- Identification: locating potentially worthwhile items to add to the collection.
- Selection: deciding which of the identified items to add to the collection.
- Acquisitions: securing items for the collection, including the purchase of books, databases, e-books, and multimedia materials for a library's collection.

== Cataloging ==
- Description: creating and adapting records for library materials and licensed content, allowing users to search and discover these resources in the library catalog. These records, often based on MARC standards and available for online public access, include descriptive elements—such as author, title, and subject—to assist users in identifying relevant resources to meet their needs.
- Classification: indexing and arranging the items acquired in a manner that will aid the end-user in locating materials in the collection. Materials are often organized by established classification systems, such as Dewey Decimal Classification or Library of Congress Classification.

== Processing ==
- Physical processing: labeling, binding, repairing, and otherwise preparing items for storage in a manner that allows for easy retrieval and maintenance over time.
- Preservation: maintaining and repairing both print and electronic materials. The former includes repairing damaged books, binding journals into hardcover volumes, and reformatting print materials to digital. The latter includes digital curation, where archivists work to preserve electronic materials from data deterioration, and periodically migrate data from older formats to newer one.

== Related systems and services ==
Technical services may also include a range of activities broadly related to the above core functions: from security processing (using RFID tags or similar), to interlibrary loan services, to maintaining the library's technology resources, such as servers, staff and public computers, scanners, or the integrated library system software that facilitates circulation.

== See also ==
- Association for Library Collections and Technical Services
- Resource Description and Access
