= IFLA Library Reference Model =

Conceptual model of bibliographic information

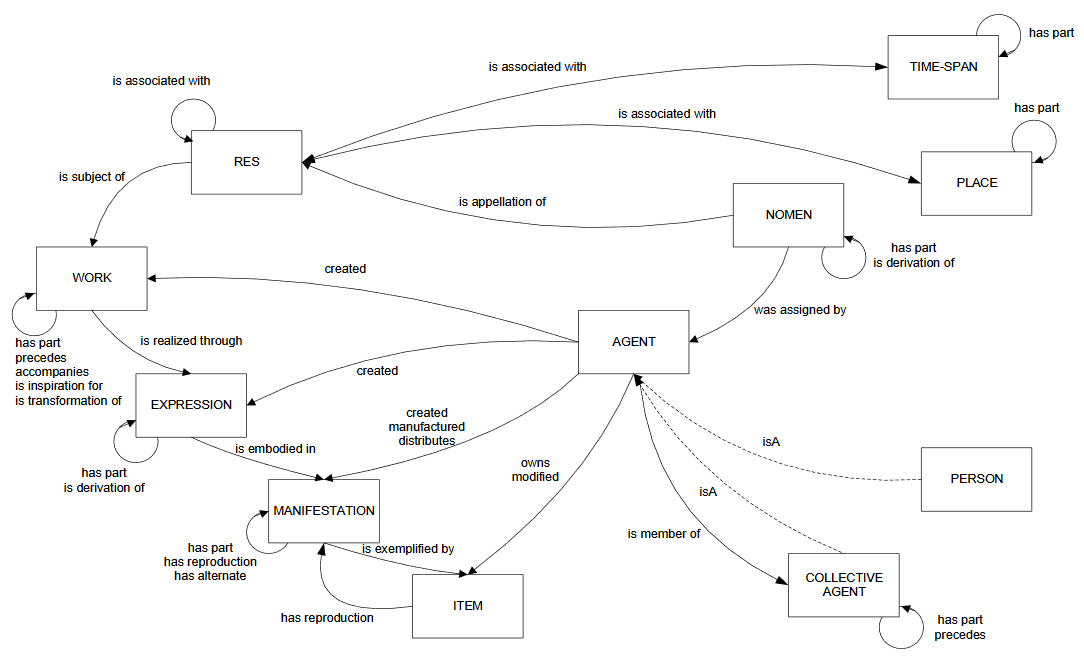
Entities and relationships in the IFLA LRM.

The IFLA Library Reference Model (IFLA LRM) is a conceptual entity–relationship model developed by the International Federation of Library Associations and Institutions (IFLA) that expresses the "logical structure of bibliographic information". It unifies the models of Functional Requirements for Bibliographic Records (FRBR), Functional Requirements for Authority Data (FRAD), and Functional Requirements for Subject Authority Data (FRSAD). The IFLA LRM is intended to be used as the basis of cataloguing rules and implementing bibliographic information systems. It has Library of Congress subject heading number 2017004509.

== Differences from FR-series models ==
IFLA LRM adds super-classes res ("thing") and agent to facilitate formal relationship definitions. Time span and place are entities rather than literal values.

It uses the same Work, Expression, Manifestation, Item (WEMI) model as FRBR Group 1 entities. The FRBR Group 2 corporate body and FRAD family are combined into a single collective agent type. FRBR Group 3 entities are deprecated. A redefined nomen type encompasses name from FRAD plus nomen, identifier, and controlled access point from FRSAD.

== See also ==
- Resource Description and Access (RDA)
- FRBRoo
- CIDOC Conceptual Reference Model
- BIBFRAME
