= Yong Pung How =

Singaporean jurist (1926–2020)

Yong Pung How DUBC DUT
- 杨邦孝
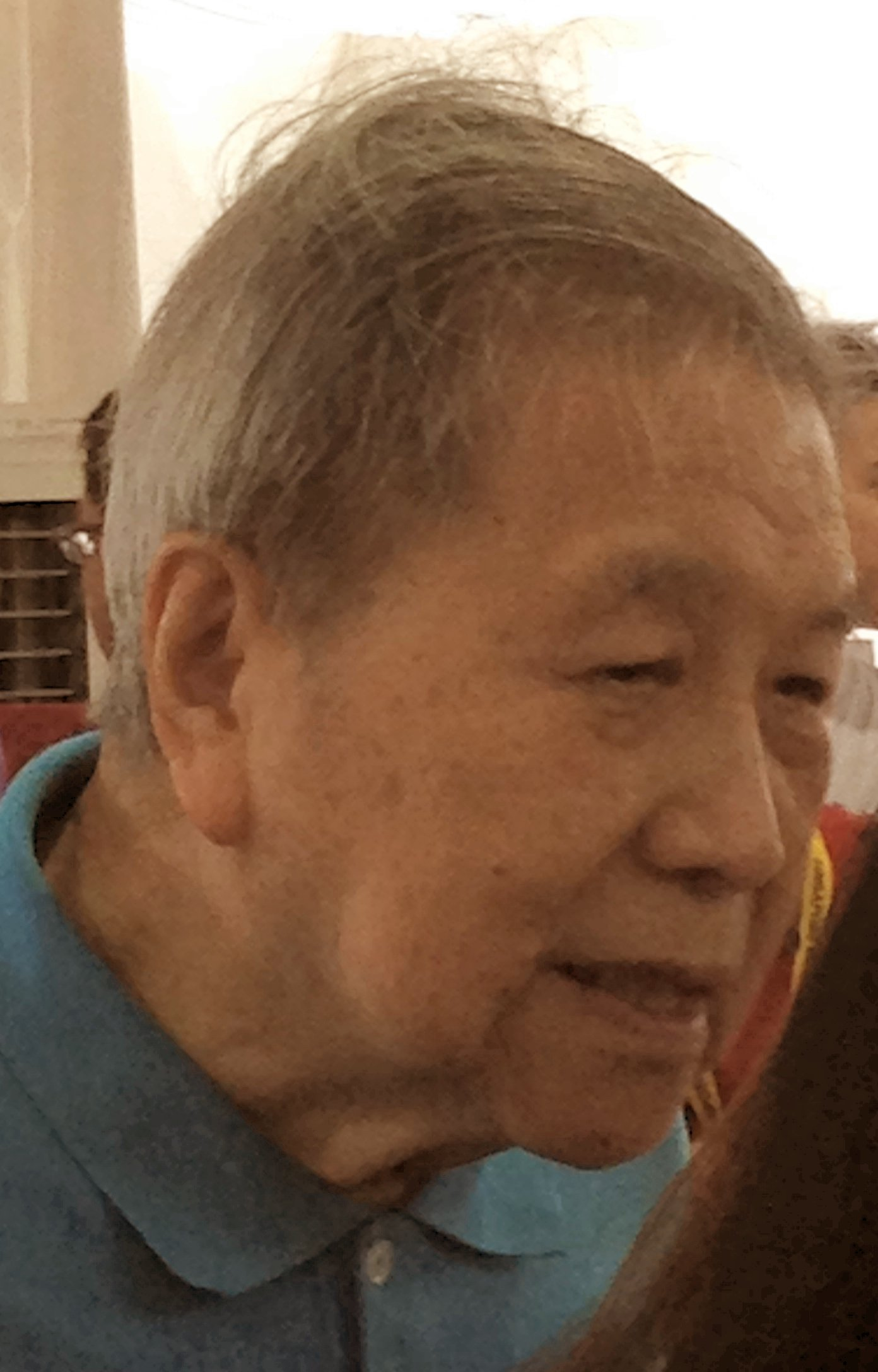
- Yong in 2014

2nd Chief Justice of Singapore
- In office 28 September 1990 – 10 April 2006
- President: Wee Kim Wee; Ong Teng Cheong; S. R. Nathan
- Preceded by: Wee Chong Jin
- Succeeded by: Chan Sek Keong

Judge of the Supreme Court of Singapore
- In office 1 July 1989 – 27 September 1990
- Appointed by: Wee Kim Wee

Personal details
- Born: 11 April 1926 Kuala Lumpur, Selangor, Federated Malay States
- Died: 9 January 2020 (aged 93) Singapore
- Resting place: Mandai Crematorium and Columbarium
- Spouse: Cheang Wei-Woo (m. 1955)
- Education: Downing College, Cambridge

Yong Pung How
- Traditional Chinese: 楊邦孝
- Simplified Chinese: 杨邦孝
Transcriptions
Standard Mandarin
- Hanyu Pinyin: Yáng Bāngxiào
- IPA: [jǎŋ páŋɕjâʊ]
Yue: Cantonese
- Jyutping: Joeng^{4} Bong^{1} Haau^{3}
- IPA: [jœŋ˩ pɔŋ˥ haw˧]
Southern Min
- Hokkien POJ: Iûⁿ Pang-hàu

Yong Pung How DUBC DUT (11 April 1926 – 9 January 2020) was a Singaporean judge, lawyer, and banker who served as the second Chief Justice of Singapore from 1990 to 2006 after being appointed by President Wee Kim Wee. During his tenure, he implemented a series of administrative and procedural reforms aimed at improving the efficiency of the judiciary, including measures to reduce case backlogs and the adoption of information technology in court processes. These initiatives contributed to the modernisation of Singapore's legal system.

Prior to his appointment to the bench, Yong held senior positions in both the legal and financial sectors. He was trained in law at Downing College, Cambridge and began his career in legal practice before moving into banking. He served in key roles such as chairman and chief executive of Oversea-Chinese Banking Corporation (OCBC) and managing director of the Monetary Authority of Singapore (MAS). Yong received several national awards in recognition of his public service. After retiring from the judiciary, he remained involved in various public and academic roles, including serving as the chancellor of the Singapore Management University (SMU) between 2010 and 2015. He died in 2020 at the age of 93. The Yong Pung How School of Law at the Singapore Management University was named after him the following year.

== Early life and education ==
Yong was born in Kuala Lumpur, then located in undivided Selangor state prior to 1974, to an ethnic Chinese family with Hakka ancestry from Dabu County, Guangdong, China. His father, Yong Shook Lin, was a lawyer who founded the law firm Shook Lin & Bok. and is the namesake of a prominent road in Petaling Jaya. After completing his early education at Victoria Institution, Yong went on to read law at Downing College, Cambridge University.

While in Cambridge, he developed close friendships with Lee Kuan Yew and Kwa Geok Choo. Yong was made an Exhibitioner and an Associate Fellow in his college years. In 1949, he graduated with a bachelor's degree in law, and qualified as an Inner Temple lawyer in 1952. In 1970, Yong attended the six-week Advanced Management Program at Harvard Business School.

== Career ==
=== Legal career ===
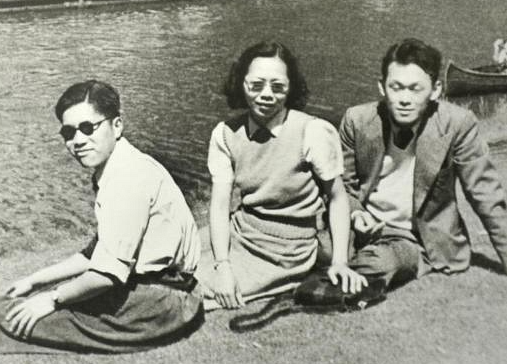
(L–R) Yong, Kwa Geok Choo, and Lee Kuan Yew at River Cam in Cambridge, 1949.

Yong was called to the English Bar at the Inner Temple and he returned to Malaya as an advocate and solicitor in 1952, practising law as a partner at his father's law firm, Shook Lin & Bok. In 1954, Yong served as the arbitrator appointed by Sir John Fearns Nicoll, the Governor of Singapore, to resolve the dispute between the Singapore government and the general clerical services and telecommunications workers. In 1960, Yong represented the Semantan Estate when it first sued the Malaysian federal government for unlawfully taking a 250-acre parcel of land in Taman Duta; the case continued in the courts for several decades, with Semantan Estate eventually being declared the rightful owner of the land in 2010. As of 2024, proceedings in the Semantan Estate case remain pending.

Yong was admitted to the Singapore Bar in 1964 and appointed to the role as Chairman of the Public Services Arbitration Tribunal in Malaya from 1954 to 1962, and as a Chairman of the Industrial Court in Malaysia between 1964 and 1967.

=== Business ===
Yong was Chairman of Malaysia-Singapore Airlines between 1964 and 1969, and as Deputy Chairman of Maybank between 1966 and 1972.

=== Financial career ===
In 1971, Yong switched from law to finance, and formed Singapore International Merchant Bankers Limited (SIMBL) and the Malaysian International Merchant Bankers (MIMB) in Malaysia, serving as Chairman and Managing Director of both companies. At the same time, he also served as a member of the Singapore Securities Industry Council from 1972 to 1981. He announced his retirement from the SIMBL and MIMB offices in 1976. In the same year, Yong was appointed Vice-Chairman of the Oversea-Chinese Banking Corporation (OCBC).

Yong was seconded in 1982 by the Singapore government to form and head the Government of Singapore Investment Corporation (GIC), and the Monetary Authority of Singapore (MAS) as well. His experience in commercial banking proved to be invaluable to GIC as he effectively re-organised and streamlined the use of Singapore's foreign reserves. He was also made Deputy Chairman of the Currency Commissioners, and Alternate Governor for Singapore of the International Monetary Fund. In 1988, Yong became the first Chairman of the newly formed Institute of Policy Studies, and established the Regional Speakers Programme, which saw prominent speakers and intellectuals from around the region to share their understanding of the culture and politics of the countries in the region. This initiative greatly helped with the development of Singapore governance.

In 1983, Yong returned to OCBC as chairman and chief executive officer, before returning to the legal sector as a judge in 1989.

=== As Chief Justice ===
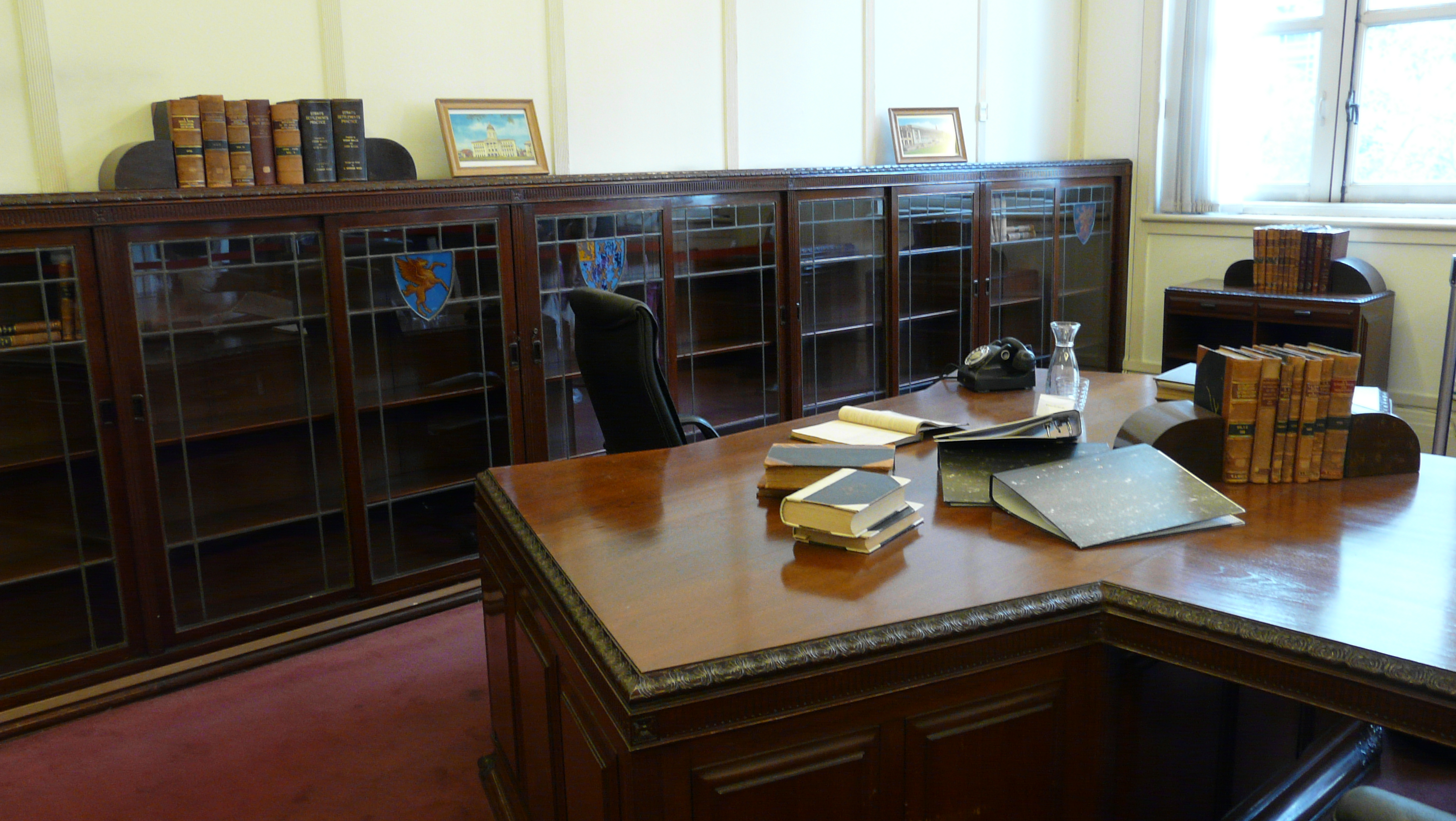
Chief Justice Yong's chambers in the Old Supreme Court Building

On 28 September 1990, Yong was appointed Chief Justice, replacing Wee Chong Jin. During his first speech at the opening of the legal year, he announced the abolition of the traditional wigs worn by judges and lawyers, and the use of archaic terms of address for judges of the Supreme Court such as "My Lord" or "Your Lordship". He also made the Singapore justice system more efficient in processing cases during his tenure by introducing cutting-edge technology into the courtroom.

In April 2006, Yong was succeeded as Chief Justice by Chan Sek Keong, who was formerly Attorney-General of Singapore.

==== Evaluation ====
Academic and jurisprudential evaluations of Yong tenure have generally focused on his role in transforming the administration of justice and his influence on the development of Singaporean jurisprudence. Scholars have noted that Yong prioritised judicial efficiency and institutional reform over the articulation of a distinct or expansive body of constitutional or common law doctrine. His leadership is often characterised as managerial rather than doctrinal, with emphasis placed on streamlining court procedures and adopting technological innovations to enhance the judiciary's operational effectiveness.

In 1991, there were about 2,000 lawsuits due to be heard in the High Court. A lawsuit could take several years to be heard. Some measures were introduced to resolve the problems which he described as an "embarrassing" state of affairs. When Yong left, it took only six months for the High Court to conclude a hearing. The speed at which trials were conducted led some critics to accuse Yong of convicting indiscriminately, leaving the burden of proof to the accused. As Chief Justice, he was also known to impose punitive sentences on those appealing cases he deemed to be frivolous.

Yong instituted night courts in the Subordinate Courts, eliminating the need for members of the public to take time off work to attend court to answer to summonses for regulatory and minor offences. He also initiated the Justices' Law Clerk (JLC) scheme, under which top law graduates from leading universities in the United Kingdom and Singapore are actively recruited to the Singapore Legal Service. First deployed in 1997 and completed in 2003, the Electronic Filing System (EFS), designed to streamline the litigation process using technology, was introduced during Yong's tenure as Chief Justice. The EFS was later replaced by the Integrated Electronic Litigation System, and was decommissioned on 1 February 2014. His reforms ultimately contributed to a significant reduction in case backlog and delay. These administrative improvements have been credited with shaping the Singapore judiciary into a highly efficient institution. Academic commentary has recognised his role in laying the groundwork for a technocratic and rules-based legal culture, though some critics have suggested that this focus on administration may have come at the expense of deeper doctrinal development, particularly in public law.

In terms of jurisprudence, Yong presided over a period when the courts generally adopted a restrained approach to constitutional interpretation and demonstrated deference to the executive in areas involving national security, public order, and administrative discretion. His judgments often emphasised legal certainty, efficiency, and fidelity to legislative intent. Some legal scholars have described the judiciary during his tenure as conservative and executive-minded, reflecting broader patterns in Singapore’s legal culture.

== Awards and honours ==
Yong was conferred the Darjah Utama Bakti Cemerlang (Distinguished Service Order) in 1989 and the Order of Temasek (First Class) on 9 August 1999, with a citation stating that "as Chief Justice since 28 September 1990, Justice Yong Pung How has made the Singapore Judiciary world class".

On 17 September 2001, Yong was awarded an honorary Doctor of Laws by the National University of Singapore Faculty of Law in recognition of his outstanding contribution to the judiciary and the judicial system in Singapore. Yong was credited with introducing sweeping reforms in the legal service, enhancing the quality and efficiency of Singapore's judicial process and making the Singapore judiciary world-class. Among his innovations was the introduction of case management which helped clear the backlog of cases and reduced the waiting time for the disposal of cases.

On 14 July 2007, Yong was awarded another honorary Doctor of Laws by the Singapore Management University (SMU) in recognition of his contribution to Singapore's legal sector. Yong was appointed as the chairman of the SMU School of Law's advisory board in March 2007. In 2007, SMU also established the Yong Pung How Professorship of Law, named after Yong and made possible by a S$3 million endowed contribution from the Yong Shook Lin Trust, which was named after Yong's father.

On 1 September 2010, Yong was appointed chancellor of the Singapore Management University. J. Y. Pillay succeed him on 1 September 2015.

On 11 April 2021, SMU's School of Law was renamed as the Yong Pung How School of Law.

== Personal life ==
Yong and Cheang Wei-Woo, a graduate of the London School of Economics, married in 1955 after having met in 1950 while they were studying. They have a daughter, Yong Ying-I. Yong died on 9 January 2020, at the age of 93.

Yong was the cousin of Yong Siew Toh—who the conservatory of the National University of Singapore is named in honour of—who was in turn the daughter of Yong Loo Lin, a businessman and medical doctor who the medical school of NUS is named after.

Legal offices
| Preceded by Wee Chong Jin | Chief Justice of Singapore; 1990–2006 | Succeeded by Chan Sek Keong |
