= European Legislation Identifier =

Uniquely identifies national and EU laws

ELI
- European Legislation Identifier
- Abbreviation: ELI
- Status: Published
- Year started: 2012; 14 years ago
- Latest version: 1.4
- Organization: European Forum of Official Gazettes, Publications office of the European Union
- Committee: ELI Task Force
- Base standards: FRBRoo, CIDOC Conceptual Reference Model
- Related standards: ELI-DL, SKOS, schema.org
- Domain: Semantic Web
- Website: eur-lex.europa.eu/eli-register/resources.html

ELI Implementation status in 2026: Pillar 1 Pillar 2 Pillar 3 Pillar 4

The European Legislation Identifier (ELI) ontology is a vocabulary for representing metadata about national and European Union (EU) legislation. It is designed to provide a standardized way to identify and describe the context and content of national or EU legislation, including its purpose, scope, relationships with other legislations and legal basis. This will guarantee easier identification, access, exchange and reuse of legislation for public authorities, professional users, academics and citizens. ELI paves the way for knowledge graphs, based on semantic web standards, of legal gazettes and official journals.

== History ==
The European Legislation Identifier (ELI) originated in 2010, when the concept was discussed at the European Forum of Official Gazettes held in Rome. From its inception, the initiative was supported by the Publications Office of the European Union, with the objective of improving the accessibility, interoperability and standardisation of legal information across Europe.

Between 2010 and 2012, a working group was established within the Forum of National Gazettes (EFOG) to further develop the technical and organisational foundations of ELI and to assess its potential adoption by national legal publishers.

In October 2012, the Council of the European Union adopted conclusions inviting the introduction of the European Legislation Identifier, encouraging Member States and EU institutions to implement a common identification system for legislation. In December 2012, an ELI Task Force was established with the support of the Council Working Party on e‑Law to coordinate implementation and governance activities at European level.

In 2014, the first version of the ELI Ontology (version 1.0) was released, providing a formal semantic model to describe legislative resources and their relationships in a machine‑readable format.

Further political endorsement was expressed in the Council conclusions of 6 November 2017, which reaffirmed support for ELI and encouraged its continued implementation and use across Member States and EU institutions.

In 2020, the ELI‑DL (Draft Legislation) standard was published, extending the ELI framework to legislative drafting processes.

In 2024, several updated specifications were released, including the latest ELI Ontology (version 1.5), the ELI Impact Ontology (version 1.0), and the ELI DL Ontology (version 3.0), further expanding the scope and technical maturity of the ELI ecosystem.

== Community ==
=== European Legislation Identifier Task Force (ELI TF) ===
The Task Force "European Legislation Identifier", short "ELI TF", is the body created by the eLaw/eLaw Working Party of the Council of the European Union to define ELI-related specifications and to ensure their future evolution

The Task Force comprises representatives of Albania, Austria, Belgium, Croatia, Denmark, Finland, France, Hungary, Ireland, Italy, Luxembourg (chair), Malta, Norway, Poland, Portugal, Serbia, Slovenia, Spain, Switzerland, the United Kingdom and the EU Publications Office.

== Overview : elements of ELI ==
The ELI TF has drafted a number of specifications that together form the ELI standard:

- Pillar I: Web identifiers for legal resources
- Pillar II: ELI ontology: Metadata set specifying how to describe legal information, and its expression in a formal ontology
- Pillar III: Recommendations for integrating metadata into legislative website
- Pillar IV: Protocol to synchronize ELI metadata

=== Pillar I: ELI identifier ===
ELI uses URI Templates (RFC 6570) that carry semantics both from a legal and an end-user point of view. Each Member State will build its own, self-describing URIs using the described components as well as taking into account their specific language requirements. All the components are optional and can be selected based on national requirements and do not have a pre-defined order. To enable the exchange of information the chosen URI template must be documented using the URI template mechanism.

Template:

/eli/{jurisdiction}/{agent}/{sub-agent}/{year}/{month}/{day}/{type}/{natural identifier}/{level 1…}/{point in time}/{version}/{language}

Example:

https://www.boe.es/eli/es/lo/2013/12/20/9 (Spain)
http://data.europa.eu/eli/dir/2020/1057/oj (European Union)

=== Pillar II: ELI ontology / metadata to describe legislation ===
In addition to HTTP URIs uniquely identifying legislation ELI encourages the use of relevant metadata elements to further describe it. Annex, section 2 fully specifies the corresponding recommended and optional elements and their underlying ontology.

The ELI ontology defines a common data model for exchanging legislation metadata on the web; the primary users of the ELI model are the official legal publishers of EU Member States, and the model can also be used by other organisations. The description of legislation in ELI is based on FRBRoo / CIDOC Conceptual Reference Model.

=== Pillar III: Recommendations for integrating metadata into legislative website ===
ELI invites participating Member States to embed these metadata elements into the webpages of their legal information systems using RDFa or JSON-LD.

Example of RDFa serialization for a Spanish legislation (extract):

<meta about="https://www.boe.es/eli/es/lo/2013/12/20/9" typeof="http://data.europa.eu/eli/ontology#LegalResource"/>
<meta about="https://www.boe.es/eli/es/lo/2013/12/20/9" property="http://data.europa.eu/eli/ontology#jurisdiction" resource="http://www.elidata.es/mdr/authority/jurisdiction/1/es"/>
<meta about="https://www.boe.es/eli/es/lo/2013/12/20/9" property="http://data.europa.eu/eli/ontology#type_document" resource="http://www.elidata.es/mdr/authority/resource-type/1/lo"/>
<meta about="https://www.boe.es/eli/es/lo/2013/12/20/9" property="http://data.europa.eu/eli/ontology#id_local" content="BOE-A-2013-13425" datatype="http://www.w3.org/2001/XMLSchema#string"/>
<meta about="https://www.boe.es/eli/es/lo/2013/12/20/9" property="http://data.europa.eu/eli/ontology#date_document" content="2013-12-20" datatype="http://www.w3.org/2001/XMLSchema#date"/>
<meta about="https://www.boe.es/eli/es/lo/2013/12/20/9" property="http://data.europa.eu/eli/ontology#number" content="9" datatype="http://www.w3.org/2001/XMLSchema#string"/>

=== Pillar IV: Protocol to synchronize ELI metadata ===
Pillar IV describes a protocol that enables ELI consumers to retrieve a) the exhaustive list of all ELI legal resources from a given ELI provider b) the list of last updated ELI legal resources from an ELI provider, using an Atom feed.

== Extension of ELI standard : ELI-DL ==
During the years 2021/2022 the ELI standard was extended with the ELI-DL standard (ELI for Draft Legislation). ELI-DL gives a formal data model to disseminate structured data about legislative projects.

The aim is to support the following use-cases :

- easier and earlier data exchange between legal information systems; typically enable Member States to know that an EU Procedures foresees an impact on existing legislation, and prepare its transposition earlier;
- legal monitoring of legislative projects to be alerted early on the legislation being drafted;
- cross-link the description of the legislative project across multiple websites (typically OJ, parliament and committees websites);
- increased transparency to the public through the publication of open data.

== Resources ==
Full documentation of ELI ontology is published by Publications Office at https://op.europa.eu/en/web/eu-vocabularies/eli.

Documentation of ELI-DL is available at https://joinup.ec.europa.eu/collection/eli-european-legislation-identifier/solution/eli-ontology-draft-legislation-eli-dl/about

Two guides are available to help guide teams implementing the ELI standard:

- ELI, the European legislation identifier: Good practices and guidelines.
- ELI technical guide

== Applications ==
As of 1st January 2023, ELI standard has been implemented by the following official gazettes : Albania, Austria, Belgium, Croatia, Denmark, EU-Publications Office, Finland, France, Hungary, Ireland, Italy, Luxembourg, Malta, Norway, Poland, Portugal, Serbia, Slovenia, Spain, Switzerland, United Kingdom.

== Tools ==
=== ELI annotation tool ===
The ELI annotation tool is a tool to enable legislation publishers to annotate and publish legal texts with metadata compliant to the ELI standard. The ELI annotation tool is used for building notices describing several legal entities (legal resources, legal expressions and formats) using standard properties

=== ELI validator ===
The ELI validator is an online service that checks published ELI metadata against rules derived from the ELI ontology and produces a validation report. It helps ELI partners to assess the conformance of their data.

=== ELI/XML ===
ELI/XML is an encoding of ELI metadata in an XML scheme (XSD). It can be used standalone or imported into other XML documents, typically in a metadata header. The ELI/XML scheme is provided with a set of XML transformations to generate ELI in RDF/XML, RDFa header or HTML+RDFa. It is meant to facilitate the integration of ELI in XML-based document workflows.

== Relationships with other standards ==
The values of some ELI metadata are controlled by controlled vocabularies formalized with the Simple Knowledge Organization System ontology.

The ELI Task Force has proposed an extension of schema.org for the description of legislation schema.org/Legislation. An ELI/Schema.org converter is available.

== See also ==
- EUR-Lex
- European Case Law Identifier (ECLI)
- Lex (URN)
