= Parliamentary informatics =

Application of information technology to the documentation of legislative activity

Parliamentary informatics is the application of information technology to the documentation of legislative activity. The principal areas of concern are the provision, in a form conveniently readable to humans or machines, of information and statistics about:

- individual legislators
- particular legislative proposals
- votes thereon
- text of legislation

Parliamentary informatics is carried on both by officials of legislatures and by private for-profit and non-profit actors, with motivations ranging from the administration of parliaments to lobbying and facilitating democratic discourse.

The division of activities between official and unofficial activity differs widely between polities, even within a single country. There exists substantial overlap with disciplines such as psephology and, as far as the text of successfully enacted legislation is concerned, legal informatics in general.

The use of parliamentary informatics is also a rapidly growing trend in parliamentary monitoring. In a September 2011, joint report from the National Democratic Institute and World Bank Institute, a survey of parliamentary monitoring organisations (PMOs) found that parliamentary informatics are used by approximately 40 percent of PMOs worldwide. The report states, "These tools can automatically aggregate and organize information from parliamentary websites and other information sources, generate visualizations (such as political finance maps), and create new platforms for citizens to interact with MPs or participate in parliamentary monitoring and policy analysis."

== Issues ==
Access to parliamentary information is the most significant issue in parliamentary informatics; access may be inhibited technologically through the provision of parliamentary information in a form not amenable to processing by machines, or legally, by copyright or other protection of the parliamentary record.

Ultimately, it may be possible to provide citizens with a comprehensive overview of all the legislation going through parliaments everywhere in the world, which would allow the tracking of the implementation of international treaties and of general legislative trends.

In a September 2011 report from the National Democratic Institute and World Bank Institute on parliamentary monitoring organisations, open data is cited as a fundamental issue for further development. The report explains, "While they have proven effective in many instances, the most useful informatics tools require the availability of parliamentary data in machine-readable or "open data" formats, which remains a challenge in many contexts."

== Around the world ==
=== International ===
see details at Akoma Ntoso

Akoma Ntoso (Architecture for Knowledge-Oriented Management of African Normative Texts using Open Standards and Ontologies) is an initiative of the United Nations Department of Economic and Social Affairs (UNDESA) that proposes an XML document schema providing sophisticated description possibilities for several Parliamentary document types (including bills, acts and parliamentary records, etc.). The work will provide the basis for the OASIS Legal XML LegalDocumentML project. Legal bodies such as the European Parliament, the European Commission, the EU Publication Office, the UK Parliament, the Scottish Parliament, the Italian Senate, the Parliament of Uruguay, the Library of Congress of Chile, the Official Journal of the Grand Duchy of Luxembourg, the German federal executive bodies alongside the federal legislative journal as well as several agencies within the United Nations have initiated projects to digitalize their legislative systems by developing application profiles of the Akoma Ntoso (AKN) legislative document standard. The "United States Legislative Markup" (USLM) schema for the United States Code (the US codified laws) was designed to be consistent with Akoma Ntoso. Akoma Ntoso was explicitly designed to be compliant with CEN Metalex, one of the other de facto standards besides Akoma Ntoso, which is used in the UK Statute Law Database. The United States Library of Congress created the Markup of US Legislation in Akoma Ntoso challenge in July 2013 to create representations of selected US bills using the most recent Akoma Ntoso standard within a couple months for a $5000 prize, and the Legislative XML Data Mapping challenge in September 2013 to produce a data map for US bill XML and UK bill XML to the most recent Akoma Ntoso schema within a couple months for a $10000 prize.

=== Albania ===
Une Votoj (in English, "I vote") is a website that provides information about the Parliament of Albania. The site structures Parliamentary plenary and committee sessions and agendas, and summaries of the proceedings. It also provides biographical notes about elected members, attendance and voting records. It was established in 2005, and is presently run by Mjaft!, an Albanian non-governmental civil society movement.

=== Australia ===
OpenAustralia.org is a community-funded site which was launched in June 2008 and automatically collects and publishes in an easy-to-read format the transcripts of all Australian Government House of Representatives and Senate debates, questions, discussions and notices. OpenAustralia.org also made available the Register of Senators' and Members' Interests online for the first time ever in Australia. The site was developed in Australia by the OpenAustralia Foundation, adapted from the UK site TheyWorkForYou built by mySociety. The site allows comment and discussion against debates and allows users to track the level of participation of Member of the House in debates, including statistics on their appearances in the House – so citizens can keep track of their representatives and be fully informed and involved with their Member's performance in the House. Within weeks of being launched OpenAustralia attracted a lot of attention and positive feedback from both the public and government and is set to pave the way for closer working relationships between government and citizens.

=== Austria ===
The National Council of Austria is covered by meinparlament.at. The website was modelled after a German partner website.

=== Belgium ===
The Chamber of Representatives is covered by mijnkamer.be / machambre.be, a bilingual (Dutch/French) volunteer project launched in 2026. It publishes the named votes of plenary sessions per member of parliament and per political group, including party-line analysis and participation rates.

=== Africa ===
"Africa i-Parliaments" is the portal of the regional initiatives of the United Nations Department of Economic and Social Affairs (UNDESA) aimed at strengthening the role of African Parliaments in fostering democracy and good governance by developing common information services and tools, and building information management capabilities with the objective of making Parliaments i-nterconnected, i-nformed i-ndependent, or in short, i-Parliaments.

The project includes two main initiatives:

Akoma Ntoso (Architecture for Knowledge-Oriented Management of African Normative Texts using Open Standards and Ontologies) proposes an XML document schema providing sophisticated description possibilities for several Parliamentary document types (including bills, acts and parliamentary records, etc.). It aims to standardise simple, technology-neutral representations of Parliamentary Documents to improve inter-Parliamentary co-operation and reduce the costs of Parliamentary IT support systems. Akoma Ntoso defines a set of recommendations and guidelines for e-Parliament services in a Pan-African context and provides an enabling framework for the effective exchange of machine readable Parliamentary Documents such as legislation, debate record, minutes, etc. The work will provide the basis for the OASIS Legal XML LegalDocumentML project.

=== Brazil ===
Interlegis is an integration and modernisation program of the Brazilian parliaments (municipals, states and federation) in partnership between the Brazilian Federal Senate and Inter-American Development Bank. The main development of Interlelegis was the LexML Brasil standard and portal.

Congresso Aberto – Open Congress.

=== Canada ===
OpenParliament.ca is a volunteer-run website providing information about the voting record and speeches of MPs.

The City of Toronto makes legislative information including voting records at toronto.ca/council

Lipad.ca is the website of an academic collaboration at the University of Toronto that includes a searchable database of the written record of Parliamentary Debates since 1901.

Gnowit.com provides a platform that tracks the Canadian parliament, and political issues in global media in real-time.

=== Chile ===
Vota Inteligente Vote in an intelligent way.

Biblioteca del Congreso Nacional Library of Congress.

=== Czech Republic ===
KohoVolit.eu is a volunteer-run website providing a sample of votings both in the Lower and Upper Chamber of the Czech Parliament allowing the user to test her or his own preferences against the MPs.

=== Denmark ===
The Parliament website (Folketinget) has records of votes, speeches, laws, and written questions in plain form.

Hvem Stemmer Hvad has elaborate parliament voting statistics and tracks parliamentary questions and media mentions of politicians. The site offers access to its data through an API. The name translates to "Who Votes What".

Kend Dit Folketing has general statistics on speeches, voting patterns and legislative proposals.

=== European Parliament ===
www.votewatch.eu has collected and displays full records of the activities of the Members of the European Parliament starting with 2004. VoteWatch.eu is based on the expertise of academics from London School of Economics and Universite Libre de Bruxelles. The website displays full records of voting, attendance and other activities (parliamentary questions, speeches, reports etc.) of MEPs from all member states. Furthermore, it shows a set of statistics that provide detailed information on how the coalitions are forming between the various European Political Groups. VoteWatch.eu has been updated for the 2009–2014 parliamentary term and in early 2010 has also released a report on the voting behaviour in the newly elected Parliament.

The site It's Your Parliament contains voting records of the Members of the European Parliament (MEPs) and makes it easy to compare voting records of individual MEPs and political groups. Users can comment on legislation, MEPs and cast their own votes. In March 2010 It's Your Parliament opened an API.

ParlTrack is closely monitoring the legislative process within the European Parliament. Among other things, it covers committee agendas, votes and tracking of dossiers via email and RSS. Parltrack is available as free software.

Testbeeld Europa shows how the Dutch Members of the European Parliament voted. It is made by the nonpartisan, non-profit Instituut voor Publiek en Politiek (IPP).

IPP in Romania ran a full site monitoring MEPs. It shut down in December 2008.

Czech-Slovak KohoVolit.eu (in English, too) prepares calculators on match between user and political groups and parties in EP, and individual MEPs. It is available for the 2009– term.

Follow the Money which aims to monitor the EU budget and runs the twin sites FarmSubsidy and FishSubsidy.

at4am.eu is a mailing list dedicated to exchange knowledge between people working in the European Parliament and people who don't, on how to use the European Parliament's web-based amendment authoring tool at4am. The source code was made available in 2012 at at4am.org.

ThinkingAboutEU gathers data from different sources and displays information about the members of the European Parliament, describing them by their most used keywords, categorizing their documents, analyzing their connections both online and offline (membership, social connections, collaborations). It's also possible to play "Match the MEP" a simple game to test the knowledge of the European Parliament.

=== Finland ===
Kansan Muisti ("the memory of the people"), follows the Finnish Parliament and investigates whether the MPs votes in accordance with the promises made in voter advice applications before the elections.

Parliament voting data is available as a RESTful API.

=== France ===
- Both the Senate and the National Assembly publish the bills in progress, the debates and the amendments on their website. They also publish most of their data as Open Data.
- Mon-Depute.fr was the first site to publish MP's voting rolls.
- An association of free software campaigners known as April has been gathering declarations from candidates standing for election about their opinion on the issue of free software, and providing an interface for voters to look up the results.
- Since 2006 Mémoire Politique has published a toolbox designed to help users reach members of French and European Parliaments, and track their voting records.
- On 14 September 2009, NosDeputes.fr was released. It tracks the activity of French Members of the Parliament (Assemblée Nationale). The software and data are released under open licences (GPL and CC-by-sa). It is hosted by Regards Citoyens. In September 2011, NosSenateurs.fr was released as a similar project on the members of the second chamber of the French Parliament (Sénat). Regards Citoyens used the parliamentary data available through these projects for multiple studies : on MP's presence as well as on lobbying
- Since 2014, La Fabrique de la Loi, another project hosted by Regards Citoyens, aims to make it easier to show how the laws are made.
- Since 2019, Datan. This website provides data about the voting behaviour of parliamentarians and political groups in the National Assembly. It computes some statistics about coalition formation between political groups, MPs' loyalty to their group, and MPs' voting proximity to the other groups.

=== Germany ===
The German federal parliament Deutscher Bundestag and eight state parliaments (Landtag) (last update: January 2012) are covered by abgeordnetenwatch.de. The website supports the transparency of MP's voting behaviour and MP's supplementary income. However, the main focus is on public Q&A. Citizens can ask questions, which can be answered by members of parliament.

Projects like Deutschland API, Bundestagger, Offenes Köln and Wahlversprechen.info are associated with the Open Data Network, a non-profit organisation of software developers and political activists to promote open access, open data, open government, transparency and participation in Germany.

Offenes Parlament is a newer effort by the German chapter of the Open Knowledge Foundation, which allows citizens to search and subscribe to parliamentary documents and plenary transcripts. The organisation is also operating Frankfurt gestalten, a local portal for the inhabitants of Frankfurt am Main.

The German Federal Ministry of the Interior started the project Elektronische Gesetzgebung ("Electronic Legislation") in 2015/2016 and published Version 1.0 of the German application profile "LegalDocML.de" in March 2020. The projects aim is to digitalize the entire legislative lifecycle from drafting to publication.

=== Georgia ===
The Georgian Parliament has information on MPs, and their voting records, and civilians have information about legislation.

=== Iran ===
The Majlis Research Center provides an informative website that publishes information on legislative drafts and their texts, timings, specifications and related signatories, as well as approved laws, with a comprehensive search engine. Mobile Apps and RSS feed has also been provided to facilitate this usage. It also presents profiles of all members of Parliament, their bio, membership of committees, and list of signed bills and law proposals.

=== Ireland ===
KildareStreet.com (named for Kildare Street, where the Irish Parliament is located) is a volunteer-made site launched in April 2009 which collects and republishes the transcripts of debates in Dáil Éireann and Seanad Éireann, and parliamentary questions. It, like the Australian project OpenAustralia is partly derived from the code base of TheyWorkForYou in the UK. It intends to expand to cover members' expenses and register of interests in the future.

=== Israel ===
Open Knesset is an open-source, volunteer-run website tracking legislative processes, voting records and trends of the Israeli parliament (Knesset).

=== Italy ===
openparlamento allows to track legislative progress, votes and Parliament members using official data from Italian Parliament. The platform lets users comment, vote and emend on every parliament act, supplies official legislative text and rss feeds. openparlamento is a non-partisan project realised by openpolis.

The source code is available on a Subversion repository at http://svn.openpolis.it/repos/openparlamento.

=== Japan ===
The National Diet Meeting Records Search System (国会会議録検索システム, Kokkai Kaigiroku Kensaku Shisutemu) of the National Diet Library lets users search for text and images related to National Diet plenary sessions and committees.

=== Jordan ===
The Jordanian Parliament Monitor is a website that provides information about the Parliament of Jordan. The site presents profiles of all members of Parliament, information about the MP's deeds and stances on public policy issues, bills and law proposals, questions to the Cabinet, interventions during plenary and committee sessions. The website also includes news about the various parties and blocs represented in Parliament, statistics about the Parliament and about MP's performance as well as the studies and reports published by the Monitor. It was established in 2009, and is run by Al-Quds Center for Political Studies, a Jordanian think-tank based in Amman.

=== Kenya ===
mzalendo: Eye On Kenyan Parliament provides electronic information about the Kenyan parliament, which is otherwise only available offline.

=== Kosovo ===
KDI Kosovo provides electronic reports and voting records from Kosovo's parliament.

=== Latvia ===
GudrasGalvas.lv is a social networking website between the citizens and their elected parliamentary representatives and ministers.

Every visitor of the site (without registration) is free to view the profiles of MPs and ministers, read their pre-election promises, blogs, overview of their on-line and media "footprint", which is updated automatically. MPs and ministers can also add their blogs, start discussions as well as post other information at their will and convenience.

Having logged in, the visitors of the site (using their Twitter, Facebook etc. accounts) can ask questions, post their comments or replies, participate in discussions and use other interactive features of GudrasGalvas.lv[*]

[*] Gudras galvas – "smart heads", words often used in Latvia when referring to the Parliament as an institution or its individual members.

=== Lithuania ===
Atviras Seimas (Open Parliament) provides statistics for MP attendance, votes, speeches, rebellions, travel maps, popularity ratings based on internet search result counts. It is a volunteer-run website.

Mano Seimas (My Parliament) publishes voting records for interesting or controversial bills, provides MP's biography and allows to ask questions and receive answers from MPs. Part of the published data is fetched through API provided by Atviras Seimas. Mano Seimas is a part of e-democracy project run by Institute of International Relations and Political Science, Vilnius University.

Manobalsas.lt (myvote) is a smart voting tool allowing users to take a test and find out which political party and candidate best matches their opinion. The site launched in 2008 before National parliament elections. More than 300 candidates registered on the site.

=== Malaysia ===
Citizen Think Tank This domain expired 24 May 2012—no useful information.

=== New Zealand ===
TheyWorkForYou.co.nz hosts a user friendly version of the NZ Parliament debate transcripts, and summarises activity by bill, by ministerial portfolio and by organisations making submissions to the Parliament. It also provides lists of how parties voted on bills in Parliament. It is a volunteer-run project.

CommoNZ provides lists of how MPs votes on non-party votes in Parliament (in New Zealand, many votes are formally conducted by the parties rather than the individuals, even in respect of MPs with constituencies).

=== Netherlands ===
POLITIX.nl tracks voting behaviour of Dutch political parties.

Stemmentracker was launched in the national elections in November 2006. For crucial votes the site provides an introduction to the vote and shows how parties voted. A voter can also vote, so the systems shows the parties that voted most like the user. Made by the nonpartisan, non-profit Instituut voor Publiek en Politiek (IPP). IPP looking for possibilities for keeping it up to date in the future.

=== Norway ===
Holder de ord is a volunteer-run, non-partisan organisation and open source website that monitors the Norwegian parliament. It provides voting records, a search engine for party promises, and analysis of which promises are kept or broken.

=== Poland ===
Sejmometr monitors the Polish parliament.
Mam Prawo Wiedzieć collects and presents information about Members of Polish Parliament (and Polish Members of the European Parliament).

=== Russia ===
In Russia, projects in the sphere of Government 2.0 are actively developing.

Government Web catalogue of all government bodies and official websites created by any government structure. It includes ratings of websites quality, special lists of government websites that violates Russian laws and so on.

Government People automatic aggregator of all Russian officials blogs. It includes ratings of persons, monitors activity by region and person competences and provides public API for reuse.

Project Duma 2.0 is a social initiative aimed to improve the laws and to find in Internet effective ways of solving problems. The aim of the project is not simply to inform officials about the citizens' decisions and initiatives, but lobbying of these ideas at the legislative level with the maximum of their application. Duma 2.0 – the first project in Russia, which was created in the global world trend called Citizen 2.0.

OpenGovData.ru – a non-profit project dedicated to the availability of information disclosed by the state for its citizens.

=== Romania ===
The Institutul pentru Politici Publice has created a web site with lots of structured data about the Romanian Parliament. Adrian Moraru, deputy director with IPP said in an interview with mySociety explains how they have had to obtain much of their Parliamentary data by court action. The site was first launched in 2006 and redesigned in 2010.

Median Research Centre launched Parlament Transparent in November 2014. This is a parliamentary monitoring tool focused on the Romanian Chamber of Deputies and organised around four dimensions: Members of the Chamber and their work, Public Policy domains, Parliamentary Party Groups (PPGs) and Data Export. The application tracks the policy specialisation and the engagement in local interest representation of each MP and enables users to compare the activity of their representatives (one-to-one and one-to-all). Moreover, Parlament Transparent allows specialised NGOs and ordinary citizens to keep track of the latest legislative developments in 15 policy areas. Other important features are automatically tracking laws adopted without debate or vote and reporting all cases of party switching. A qualitative feature of the application refers to presenting and explaining the most controversial bills and votes taken in the current legislative cycle.

=== South Africa ===
Parliamentary Monitoring Group hosts news, documents, speeches, statements and press releases from committees in the South African parliament.

=== United Kingdom ===
The situation in the United Kingdom is very active, with several of the major volunteer projects run by mySociety. The official UK Parliament website provides transcripts of the Parliamentary debates and votes in plain text form, and these are parsed by a project known as parlparse into a timeline of publicly available structured XML files. These files provide the data for TheyWorkForYou, which hosts the speeches in a user friendly form and creates email alerts and rss feeds, and Public Whip, which keeps track of the votes and allows for an expression of their meanings in plain English.

Independently of this, the academic Philip Cowley at Nottingham University researches specifically into how MPs vote through his Revolts website and publications.

Commercial companies DeHavilland, Dods, Randall's Monitoring and many traditional public affairs consultancies offer paid for parliamentary monitoring and wider research and intelligence services.

=== Sweden ===
Citizen Intelligence Agency displays data, metadata and charts for Swedish parliament and government.

=== United Nations ===
The website Undemocracy gives hyperlinked access to transcripts of the General Assembly and Security Council of the United Nations, with parsed voting records.

Several agencies within the United Nations have initiated projects to dig- italize their legislative systems by developing application profiles of the Akoma Ntoso (AKN) legislative document standard.
