= BIBFRAME =

Data model for bibliographic description

BIBFRAME (Bibliographic Framework) is a data model for bibliographic description. BIBFRAME was designed to replace the MARC standards, and to use linked data principles to make bibliographic data more useful both within and outside the library community.

== History ==
The MARC Standards, which BIBFRAME seeks to replace, were developed by Henriette Avram at the U.S. Library of Congress during the 1960s. By 1971, MARC formats had become the national standard for dissemination of bibliographic data in the United States, and the international standard by 1973.

In a provocatively titled 2002 article, library technologist Roy Tennant argued that "MARC Must Die", noting that the standard was old; used only within the library community; and designed to be a display, rather than a storage or retrieval format. A 2008 report from the Library of Congress wrote that MARC is "based on forty-year old techniques for data management and is out of step with programming styles of today."

In 2012, the Library of Congress announced that it had contracted with Zepheira, a data management company, to develop a linked data alternative to MARC. Later that year, the library announced a new model called MARC Resources (MARCR). That November, the library released a more complete draft of the model, renamed BIBFRAME. (Note: For a detailed history of discontent with the MARC standards between Tennant's 2002 article and the 2012 announcement of BIBFRAME, see Kroeger, Angela (2013). "The Road to BIBFRAME: The Evolution of the Idea of Bibliographic Transition into a Post-MARC Future". Cataloging & Classification Quarterly. 51 (8): 873–890. doi:10.1080/01639374.2013.823584. S2CID 62246328.)

The Library of Congress released version 2.0 of BIBFRAME in 2016.

== Design ==
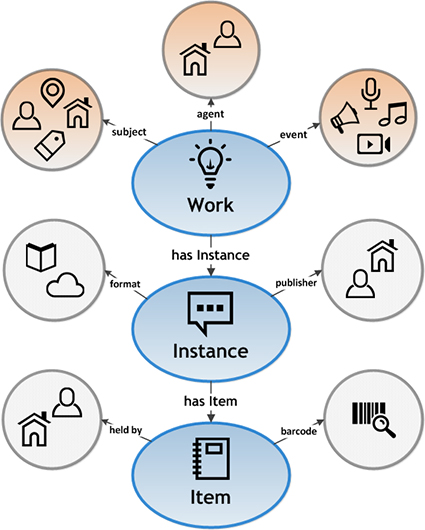
Illustration of BIBFRAME 2.0 model, with three core levels of abstraction (in blue)—Work, Instance, Item—and three related classes (in orange)—Agent, Subject, Event.

BIBFRAME is expressed in RDF and based on three categories of abstraction (work, instance, item), with three additional classes (agent, subject, event) that relate to the core categories. While the work entity in BIBFRAME may be "considered as the union of the disjoint work and expression entities" in IFLA's Functional Requirements for Bibliographic Records (FRBR) entity relationship model, BIBFRAME's instance entity is analogous to the FRBR manifestation entity. This represents an apparent break with FRBR and the FRBR-based Resource Description and Access (RDA) cataloging code. However, the original BIBFRAME model argues that the new model "can reflect the FRBR relationships in terms of a graph rather than as hierarchical relationships, after applying a reductionist technique." Since both FRBR and BIBFRAME have been expressed in RDF, interoperability between the two models is technically possible.

=== Specific formats ===
The BIBFRAME model includes a serial entity for journals, magazines, and other periodicals. Several issues have prevented the model from being used for serials cataloging. BIBFRAME lacks several serials-related data fields available in MARC.

A 2014 report was optimistic about BIBFRAME's suitability for describing audio and video resources, but also expressed concern about the high-level Work entity, which is unsuitable for modeling certain audio resources.

== Implementations ==
- The Library of Congress has a web page that lists institutions that have experimented with implementing BIBFRAME.
- Colorado College's Tutt Library created several experimental apps using BIBFRAME, reported in 2013.
- Ex Libris published a roadmap in 2017 to implement BIBFRAME in its library systems, which includes a MARC-to-BIBFRAME transformation.
- The National Library of Sweden was the first national library to fully transition to BIBFRAME in 2018.
- University of Concepción's library, in Chile, is the first Latin American university library to start transitioning to BIBFRAME, in 2023.

== Related initiatives and standards ==
- RDA, FRBR, FRBRoo, FRAD, and FRSAD are available in RDF in the Open Metadata Registry, a metadata registry.
- Schema Bib Extend project, a W3C-sponsored community group has worked to extend Schema.org to make it suitable for bibliographic description.

== See also ==
- Europeana
- Functional Requirements for Bibliographic Records (FRBR)
- Functional Requirements for Authority Data (FRAD)
- Functional Requirements for Subject Authority Data (FRSAD)
- International Standard Bibliographic Description (ISBD)
- IFLA Library Reference Model (LRM)
- Linked data
- Metadata Authority Description Schema (MADS)
- Metadata Object Description Schema (MODS)
- Open Library
- Resource Description and Access (RDA)
- Schema.org
