= European Case Law Identifier =

Identifier of court judgements in Europe

The European Case Law Identifier (ECLI) is an identifier for court decisions in European Union member states. The identifier consists of five elements separated by colons: ECLI:[country code]:[court identifier]:[year of decision]:[specific identifier]. The standard is laid down in the Council Conclusions inviting the introduction of the European Case Law Identifier (ECLI) and a minimum set of uniform metadata for case law of the European Union. The ECLI framework also contains a set of uniform metadata to improve search facilities for case law. Court decisions that have an ECLI assigned can be indexed by the ECLI Search Engine of the European e-Justice portal.

== History ==
The concept of ECLI was first launched at the Legal Access Conference (Paris, December 2008) and at Jurix Conference on Artificial Intelligence and Law in Florence (December 2008). Around the same time, the study by a task group of the EU Council Working Group on e-Law showed that accessibility of judicial decisions, both at the national and European level, was seriously hampered by the lack of standardised identifiers and metadata:

The task group suggested to establish a voluntary common identification system based on the European Case-Law Identifier (ECLI). ECLI as an identifier would be linked to an index with references. This would enable any citizen or legal practitioner to find any decision to which ECLI has been attributed from any public or private register or database in the EU. In addition a Dublin-core implementation for case-law should be established to facilitate searching case-law in different search engines.

Based on the report of this task group, the Council of Ministers agreed on the principles of ECLI and common metadata, and asked the EU Council Working Party on Legal Data Processing (e-Law) to elaborate the initial work. This continued work resulted in the Council Conclusion inviting the introduction of the European Case Law Identifier (ECLI) and a minimum set of uniform metadata for case law of the European Union, decided upon by the Council of Ministers on 22 December 2010. It was published in the Official Journal of 29 April 2011 (2011/C 127/01).

== Identifier construction ==
ECLI does not primarily identify a paper or electronic document containing a judgment, but instead identifies the court decision at a more abstract level. In the terminology of the Functional Requirements for Bibliographic Records on which it is based, ECLI is a work-level identifier. It is constructed with the intention to be meaningful, open, technologically neutral, recognisable for both humans and computers, error-proof and interoperable with other identifiers. The formatting rules for ECLI are prescribed in detail in the Annex to the Council Conclusions. Summarized, an ECLI always consists of five parts, separated by a colon:

- 'ECLI' as a self-identifier;
- The country code, prescribed by the interinstitutional style guide of the EU. The standard uses mostly ISO 3166-1 alpha-2 codes with the exception of the United Kingdom (UK) and Greece (EL). A special code for non-states can be assigned by the European Commission;
- The court code, to be assigned by the national ECLI co-ordinator; it has a maximum length of seven positions;
- The year the judgment is rendered, written in four digits;
- A unique code to make an ECLI unique. The maximum length of this code is 25 characters. Only letters, digits and dots are to be used, other punctuation marks or whitespace are not allowed. Pre-existing national identifiers can be used for this fifth part, of which the date of judgment can be a part too. Also a serial number which is generated especially for ECLI is possible. It is up to the national ECLI co-ordinator to decide on the construction of this last part.

Only the Latin alphabet is to be used, and ECLI is case-insensitive, although it is written preferably in capitals. An example of a case law identifier of the Dutch Supreme Court is ECLI:NL:HR:1841:1, which indicates a Dutch decision (NL) of 1841 of the Supreme Court (HR) with serial number 1.

== ECLI website ==
According to paragraph 4 of the Annex to the Council Conclusions an ECLI website has to be set up, containing

- general information on ECLI;
- a list of participating countries, with, for each country:
  - the court codes used;
  - information on the formatting of the fifth part of the ECLI code;
  - information on the national ECLI co-ordinator.

The ECLI website was set up within the frame work of the e-justice portal of the European Union.

== ECLI search engine ==
According to paragraph 5 of the Annex to the Council Conclusions an ECLI Search Engine has to be set up, enabling search by ECLI and metadata. This ECLI search engine launched on 4 May 2016. It provides access to national and European case law, stored in whatever database. Searches are possible on the basis of the ECLI, its metadata as well as full-text.

As prescribed by the Council Conclusions a resolver is available at https://e-justice.europa.eu/ecli/; with an ECLI typed after it, this link with show all available information on this ECLI, from whatever indexed website. As an example: https://e-justice.europa.eu/ecli/ECLI:CZ:NS:2015:32.CDO.2051.2013.1 shows from ECLI:CZ:NS:2015:32.CDO.2051.2013.1, a decision from the Czech Supreme Court, the information from the website of that court as well as from the Jurifast database of the Association of Councils of State and Supreme Administrative Jurisdictions of the EU. The latter document also has English and French metadata.

Documents are indexed by the ECLI search engine in cooperation between the European Commission and data providers, using the sitemaps protocol and robots.txt.

== Organisation ==
The Council of Ministers is responsible for any future changes in the standard, while the European Commission is responsible for the ECLI-website and the maintenance of the ECLI Search Engine.

=== National level ===
Every Member State (or other entity that wishes to participate in the ECLI system, including the EU itself) must have a national ECLI co-ordinator. The main responsibilities of this national ECLI co-ordinator are:

- to decide on the court codes to be used (the third part of the ECLI);
- to decide on the construction of the fifth part of ECLI;
- to update the national information pages on the implementation of ECLI on the European e-justice portal;
- to decide on specific language varieties of certain metadata.

== Implementation in individual jurisdictions ==
According to the Council Conclusions, Member States are free to decide on their own implementation route. A big-bang scenario is possible, but also a step-by-step approach is allowed. International organizations may also participate and can request a "country code" from the European Commission.

The table below lists all EU Member States and their current state of ECLI implementation. Also relevant European organisations that have implemented ECLI are included.

EU Member State or European organisation	Implemented in public database	Year of ECLI going live	Coverage	National ECLI co-ordinator	Indexed by ECLI Search Engine	Number of decisions indexed (rounded, as of 12–08–2026)	Comments
Austria	Yes	2014	Federal administrative court, Federal financial court, administrative courts, Constitutional court, Data protection Authority, Supreme Court	Federal Chancellery.	No	0	
Belgium	Yes	2017	Decisions in the internal database VAJA (all courts except administrative courts).		Yes	235 000	ECLI is not included in the public database Juridat. Hence, assigned ECLI codes can only be found via the ECLI Search Engine.
Bulgaria	Yes	2018	All decisions published by all courts in the national database.	Supreme Judicial Council	Yes	3 000 000	
Croatia	Yes	2017	Most decisions from Supreme Court and other relevant decisions in the Croatian database.	Supreme Court	Yes	230 000	
Cyprus	No			Department of Legal Publications	Yes	35 000	
Czech Republic	Yes	2012	Decisions in the database of the Supreme Court (also from other courts).	Supreme Court	Yes	430 000	
Denmark	No			Danish Court Administration	No	0	Implementation of ECLI is foreseen in a new database with court decisions.
Estonia	Yes	2017	All published decisions.		Yes	320 000	
Finland	Yes	2016	Unknown.	Ministry of Justice	No	100	ECLI is only added in the open data portal, not on the Finlex public website. The Finnish decisions that can be found in the ECLI Search Engine are those included in the JuriFast database of ACA Europe.
France	Yes	2012	Decisions of Council of State (Conseil d'Etat), Supreme Court (Cour de cassation), Constitutional Council (Conseil Constitutionnel), Tribunal des conflits.	Office of Legal and Administrative Information	Yes	150 000	
Germany	Yes	2013	Federal administrative court, Constitutional Court and the Federal Labour Court. ECLI is also available for 100 000 decisions of the courts of North Rhine-Westphalia.	Competence center for the federal legal information system of the Federal Office of Justice	Yes	56.000	
Greece	Yes	2016	Council of State.		Yes	100 000	
Hungary	No				No	0	
Ireland	No			Department of Justice	No	0	
Italy	Yes	2016	Supreme Court, Constitutional Court, Council of State, administrative courts, Court of auditors.	Ministry of Justice's Directorate‑General for Automated Information Systems (ad interim)	Yes	5 400 000	
Latvia	Yes	2017	All decisions published in the national database.	Court administration	Yes	166 000	Implementation was realised in an EU co-funded project.
Lithuania	No			National Courts Administration	Yes	540 000	
Luxembourg	No				No	0	
Malta	No				No	0	ECLI has been introduced in December 2011 for all new court decisions, but the code is as still not visible to the public.
Netherlands	Yes	2013	ECLI has been assigned to all decisions published in public database of the judiciary, in internal databases as well as to (historic) decisions published by commercial publishers.		Yes	270 000	Only the (270 000) decisions that have been published (full-text) in the public database of the judiciary have been indexed by the ECLI Search Engine. Metadata about all other ECLIs (around 2 million) that have been assigned can be found in the Dutch public database as well.
Portugal	Yes	2017	All decisions published since 1932, accessible via the Portuguese ECLI search engine.	Judicial High Council	Yes	250 000	Implementation was realised in an EU co-funded project.
Romania	No			Ministry of Justice	No	0	ECLI has been introduced in the internal ECRIS database, but has not yet been included in the public ROLII database.
Slovenia	Yes	2011	All decisions in the public database.	Supreme Court	Yes	176 000	Slovenia was the first country to implement ECLI.
Slovakia	Yes	2012	All decisions delivered after 25 July 2011 have an ECLI assigned. If a decision from before this date is appealed after it, it has an ECLI assigned as well.	Informatics and Project Management Section of the Ministry of Justice	No	0	
Spain	Yes	2014	All decisions published in the public database have an ECLI assigned.	Centre for Judicial Documentation (CENDOJ)	Yes	3.300.000	
Benelux Union	Yes	2026	ECLI is assigned to decisions on prejudicial questions by the Benelux Court of Justice.		No	392	Uses BU as its "country code" and CBNL as Benelux Court of Justice court code.
European Union	Yes	2014	ECLI is assigned to all decisions of the Court of Justice. These decisions are available in EUR-Lex as well in the database of the Court of Justice.	Court of Justice of the EU	Yes	43 000	
Council of Europe	Yes	2015	ECLI is assigned to all decisions of the European Court of Human Rights in the public HUDOC database.	European Court of Human Rights	No	0	Uses CE as its "country code" and ECHR as its "court code".
European Patent Office	Yes	2013	ECLI is assigned to all decisions of the Boards of Appeal in the public database.	Publication Department of the European Patent Office.	Yes	36.000	Uses EP as its "country code".

== Metadata ==
Metadata are to be attached to documents containing a judicial decision. They can relate to the ECLI itself (on the bibliographic work level, e.g.: date of the decision), but also to a specific editorial version (the 'expression level', e.g. a summary). In the Council Conclusions nine mandatory and eight optional metadata are listed. All these are based on the Dublin Core metadata standard. The mandatory means that without these metadata, a document can not be indexed by the ECLI Search Engine.

=== Mandatory metadata ===
The mandatory metadata, as listed in the Annex to the Council Conclusions, are:

- dcterms:identifier: a URL where the document is located;
- dcterms:isVersionOf: the ECLI;
- dcterms:creator: the name of the court;
- dcterms:coverage: country or part thereof;
- dcterms:date: the date of the decision;
- dcterms:language: the language of the document;
- dcterms:publisher: the organisation responsible for the publication of the current document;
- dcterms:accessRights: either public or private;
- dcterms:type: the type of decision. If none is specified it defaults to 'judicial decision'.

=== Optional metadata ===
The optional metadata, as listed in the Annex to the Council Conclusions, are:

- dcterms:title; a Title field
- dcterms:subject: the field of law; at least one value should be picked out of a controlled vocabulary;
- dcterms:abstract: a summary or description;
- dcterms:description: keywords or headnotes;
- dcterms:contributor: judges, advocate-general or other staff;
- dcterms:issued: the date of the current document (not necessarily the date of the decision);
- dcterms:references: References to other case law (the use of CELEX-numbers or ECLI's is advised, but also other formats are allowed);
- dcterms:isReplacedBy: ECLI by which the ECLI has been replaced (to guarantee persistency in case ECLI's are renumbered).

== See also ==
- European Legislation Identifier (ELI)
- Lex (URN)
