= Electronic court =

Electronic alternative to a traditional court

An electronic court or ECourt, (sometimes written as eCourt, or e-Court) is a location in which matters of law are adjudicated upon, in the presence of qualified Judge or Judges, which has a well-developed technical infrastructure. This infrastructure is usually designed to allow parties, participants and other stakeholders to better operate some administrative and procedural aspects of the court’s functions, such as presenting evidence, filing judicial records (electronic court filing) or receiving testimony remotely.

Often referred to as a paperless court, its objective is, in part, to reduce the reliance on paper or hard-copy documents during the judicial process. On a larger scale, an electronic court is usually implemented to increase the efficiency of the court by expediting access to information.

The International Criminal Court in The Hague is often cited as a good example of an electronic court.
