= Akoma Ntoso =

Digital document technical standard

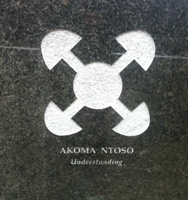
- The akoma ntoso symbol (as seen on the US African Burial Ground National Monument in New York City)
- Internet media type: application/akn+xml
- Developed by: UN DESA; OASIS
- Initial release: 30 August 2018; 7 years ago
- Type of format: Legal informatics
- Extended from: XML
- Standard: Akoma Ntoso 1.0 - XML vocabulary and specifications
- Open format?: Yes

Architecture for Knowledge-Oriented Management of African Normative Texts using Open Standards and Ontologies (abbreviated as Akoma Ntoso or AKN) is an international technical standard for representing legal documents (executive, legislative, and judiciary) in a structured manner using a domain specific, legal XML vocabulary. The term akoma ntoso means "linked hearts" in the Akan language of West Africa.

Akoma Ntoso is a legal document standard designed to serve as a basis for modern machine-readable and fully digital legislative and judicial processes. This is achieved by providing a coherent syntax and well-defined semantics to represent legal documents in a digital format. It is designed to be suitable as a common exchange format in all parliamentary, legal and judicial systems around the world.

Taking advantage of the shared heritage present in all legal systems, Akoma Ntoso has been developed to have ample flexibility to respond to all the differences in texts, languages, and legal practices. Aiming to expand on certain common practices, the standard therefore has a broad scope. It includes a common extensible model for data (the document content) and metadata (such as bibliographic information and annotations). Specifically, as a common legal document standard for the interchange of legal documents it is designed to be highly flexible in its support of documents and functionalities, maintaining a large set of both structural and semantic building blocks (over 500 entities in version 3.0) for representing this wide variety of document types of virtually all legal traditions. It is extensible in order to allow for modifications to address the individual criteria of organizations or unique aspects of various legal practices and languages without sacrificing interoperability with other systems.

Akoma Ntoso is as such part of a wider approach to developing open, non-proprietary technical standards for structuring legal documents and information under the name of Legal XML, which also includes formats and standards for, e.g., eContracts, eNotarization, electronic court filings, the technical representation of legal norms and rules (LegalRuleML) or technical standards for the interfaces of, e.g., litigant portal exchange platforms.

Akoma Ntoso allows machine-driven processes to operate on the syntactic and semantic components of digital parliamentary, judicial and legislative documents, thus facilitating the development of high-quality information resources. It can substantially enhance the performance, accountability, quality and openness of parliamentary and legislative operations based on best practices and guidance through machine-assisted drafting and machine-assisted (legal) analysis. Embedded in the environment of the semantic web, it forms the basis for a heterogenous yet interoperable ecosystem, with which these tools can operate and communicate, as well as for future applications and use cases based on digital law or rule representation.

== Definition ==
The Akoma Ntoso standard defines a set of machine readable electronic representations in XML format of the building blocks of parliamentary, legislative and judiciary documents. As official self-description, the standard

(...) defines a set of simple, technology-neutral electronic representations of parliamentary, legislative and judiciary documents for e-services in a worldwide context and provides an enabling framework for the effective exchange of "machine readable" parliamentary, legislative and judiciary documents such as legislation, debate record, minutes, judgements, etc.

Providing access to primary legal materials, parliamentary works and judiciaries documents is not just a matter of giving physical or on-line access to them. "Open access" requires the information to be described and classified in a uniform and organized way so that content is structured into meaningful elements that can be read and understood by software applications, so that the content is made "machine readable" and more sophisticated applications than on-screen display are made possible.

The standard is composed of:

- an XML vocabulary that defines the mapping between the structure of legal documents and their equivalent in XML;
- specifications of an XML schema that defines the structure of legal documents in XML. They provide rich possibilities of description for several types of parliamentary, legislative and judiciary document, such as bills, acts and parliamentary records, judgments, or gazettes;
- a recommended naming convention for providing unique identifiers to legal sources based on FRBR model;
- a MIME type definition.

== History and adoption ==
Akoma Ntoso started as an UNDESA project in 2004 within the initiative "Strengthening Parliaments' Information Systems in Africa". Its core vocabulary was created mostly by Monica Palmirani and Fabio Vitali, two professors from the Centre for Research in the History, Philosophy, and Sociology of Law and in Computer Science and Law (CIRSFID) of the University of Bologna. A first legislative text editor supporting Akoma Ntoso was developed in 2007 on the base of OpenOffice.

In 2010 European Parliament developed an open source web-based application called AT4AM based on Akoma Ntoso for facilitating the production and the management of legislative amendments. Thanks to this project, the application of Akoma Ntoso could be extended to new type of documents (e.g. legislative proposal, transcript) and to other scenarios (e.g., multilingual translation process).

Akoma Ntoso also was explicitly designed to be compliant with CEN Metalex, one of the other popular legal standards, which is used in the legislation.gov.uk.

In 2012, the Akoma Ntoso specifications became the main working base for the activities of the LegalDocML Technical Committee within the LegalXML member section of OASIS.

The "United States Legislative Markup" (USLM) schema for the United States Code (the US codified laws), developed in 2013, and the LexML Brasil XML schema for Brazilian legislative and judiciary documents, developed before, in 2008, were both designed to be consistent with Akoma Ntoso.

The United States Library of Congress created the Markup of US Legislation in Akoma Ntoso challenge in July 2013 to create representations of selected US bills using the most recent Akoma Ntoso standard within a couple months for a $5000 prize, and the Legislative XML Data Mapping challenge in September 2013 to produce a data map for US bill XML and UK bill XML to the most recent Akoma Ntoso schema within a couple months for a $10000 prize.

The National Archives of UK converted all the legislation in AKN in 2014. The availability of bulk legislation "moved the UK's ranking from fourth to first, in the 2014 Global Open Data Index, for legislation".

The Senate of Italian Republic provides, since July 2016, all the bills in Akoma Ntoso as bulk in open data repository.

The German Federal Ministry of the Interior started the project Elektronische Gesetzgebung ("Electronic Legislation") in 2015/2016 and published Version 1.0 of the German application profile "LegalDocML.de" in March 2020. The projects aim is to digitalize the entire legislative lifecycle from drafting to publication. Germany decided to adopt a model-driven development approach to creating and providing a subschema-based application profile in order to ensure interoperability among organizationally independent actors, each with their respective IT landscapes and tools. In this initial version LegalDocML.de covers draft bills in the form of laws, regulations and general administrative directives. As part of an ongoing development process, the standard could incrementally be expanded in future stages to include all relevant document types of parliamentary, legislative and promulgation processes and tools.

The High-Level Committee on Management (HLCM), part of the United Nations System Chief Executives Board for Coordination, set up a Working Group on Document Standards that approved in April 2017 to adopt Akoma Ntoso as standard for modeling its documentation.

Akoma Ntoso in its version 1.0 is finally adopted as OASIS standard in the frame of LegalDocML in August 2018.

== See also ==
- Legal XML
- LexML
- Legal informatics
- Parliamentary informatics
- LegalDocML (OASIS LegalDocumentML)
