= LexML =

Joint initiative for structuring official documents

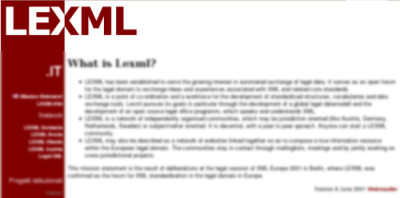

The LexML is a joint initiative of the Civil Law legal system countries seeking to establish open standards for the interchange, identification and structuring of legislative and court information, especially official documents.

Participated in this initiative are Germany, Brazil, Spain, Italy, through local institutions, with the goal of convergence of national standards and the international standardization of some instruments, such as URN LEX and the use of XML formatting standards and the exchange of its metadata.

One of the initial goals of the initiative, later abandoned, was the standardization of a single language (called LexML) for marking of legal normative documents of all participating countries. The name "LexML" derives "lex" prefix (Law in Latin) and the acronym ML (English Markup Language) used as a suffix in XML markup languages schemes.

Currently only Brazil LexML initiative called "LexML" to its XML schema. Other former participants migrated to Akoma Ntoso and EUR-Lex.
