= OpenAustralia Foundation =

Australian non-profit organisation

- Formation: 2009
- Founders: Matthew Landauer; Katherine Szuminska
- Type: Non-profit organisation
- Legal status: Company limited by guarantee
- Website: oaf.org.au

The OpenAustralia Foundation (OAF) is a non-profit organisation aimed at improving government transparency. Its projects include Right to Know, a website allowing users to submit freedom of information requests, and They Vote for You, a parliamentary informatics website.

== Structure ==
OpenAustralia is a registered charity that operates as a company limited by guarantee. It was established in 2009, co-founded by Matthew Landauer and Katherine Szuminska.

== Projects ==
One of the foundation's earliest projects was Election Leaflets, a website established in the lead-up to the 2010 federal election that allowed users to upload pamphlets that they receive from political parties. It allowed voters to track if parties were emphasising different policies in different electorates or if candidates were offering policies that differed from party platforms. Leaflets uploaded to the website were retained on the National Library of Australia's Pandora archive.

=== Right to Know ===
Right to Know, established in 2012, allows users to submit freedom of information (FOI) requests to government bodies under the Freedom of Information Act 1982.

=== They Vote For You ===
They Vote For You, established in 2014, tracks the outcomes of all votes in the House of Representatives and Senate. It displays "voting patterns by politician, when they vote against their own party, and offers descriptions of divisions in plain English". It received start-up funding from Google.

== Controversy ==
=== ATO conflict ===
In 2016, the Australian Taxation Office (ATO) stated it would no longer cooperate with FOI requests received via Right to Know, on the grounds that the organisation had breached the privacy of ATO staff members. In response, Right to Know stated that the privacy breach was due to the failure of the ATO to correctly redact its own documents. In 2017, the Office of the Australian Information Commissioner ruled that the ATO had breached its obligations under the FOI Act by refusing to process the requests.

=== Accusations of bias ===
In 2021, federal Liberal MPs Andrew Bragg and Dave Sharma accused They Vote for You of distorting their voting records, making formal complaints to the Australian Charities and Not-for-profits Commission and the Australian Electoral Commission. The website stated that Bragg had voted against LGBT rights and an Indigenous voice to government, "despite leading a campaign in the Coalition to legalise gay marriage and authoring a book backing the Voice".

In response, the foundation's director Matthew Landauer stated that it was independent and non-partisan. He "acknowledged that They Vote for You was constrained to recording only MPs’ formal votes and that MPs could be wedged by motions that supported good aims but also criticised their parties or proposed controversial solutions".

In March 2022, in the lead-up to the 2022 federal election, Bragg and Sharma began legal action against the foundation on the grounds that it had engaged in "misleading and deceptive conduct".
