= Legal XML =

Non-profit organization

Legal XML is a non-profit organization developing in the frame of the OASIS consortium open standards for legal documents, such as electronic court filing, court documents, legal citations, and transcripts, and related applications. The building block for Legal XML standards is eXtensible Markup Language ("XML").

LegalDocML and LegalRuleML are affiliated committees and standard proposals of the LegalXML committee.

== Origin and organization ==
The LegalXML initiative was launched in 1998 by lawyers, court administrators, academics and IT experts. The organization of several hundreds of members in 2000, joined in 2002 the international non-profit consortium OASIS as a member section. Member sections are special interest groups within the consortium that keep their own identity and decide themselves on their work program. Its contributing members include international and governmental organizations, courts and judiciary institutions, universities and law schools, as well as technology providers.

LegalXML work is performed by technical committees (TCs). The currently active ones are:

- OASIS LegalDocumentML TC (also known as LegalDocML) : aims to develop standards to represent, and manage legal documents as authorial, authentic, valid and persistent digital resources. Its work is based upon the Akoma Ntoso (from the United Nations Department of Economic and Social Affairs). The United States Library of Congress created the Markup of US Legislation in Akoma Ntoso challenge in July 2013 to create representations of selected US bills using the most recent Akoma Ntoso standard within a couple months for a $5000 prize, and the Legislative XML Data Mapping challenge in September 2013 to produce a data map for US bill XML and UK bill XML to the most recent Akoma Ntoso schema within a couple months for a $10000 prize.
- OASIS LegalRuleML TC: aims to enable legal arguments to be created, evaluated, and compared using rule representation tools.
- OASIS LegalXML Electronic Court Filing TC: defines standards using XML to create and transmit legal documents among attorneys, courts, litigants, and others.

Previous technical committees that are no longer active were:

- OASIS LegalXML eNotarization TC: this committee was active from 2002 to 2010, developing technical requirements to govern self-proving electronic legal information.

== Standards ==
LegalDocumentML TC has adopted Akoma Ntoso 1.0 as OASIS standard for the exchange of parliamentary, legislative and judiciary documents in August 2018. This standard is adapted to various national or supranational bodies by means of the creation of application profiles.

LegalRuleML TC has adopted, as a first step of its standardization process, the LegalRuleML Core Specifications 1.0 for the definition of normative rules in April 2020.

LegalXML Electronic Court Filing TC has adopted Electronic Court Filing specifications version 4.01 (ECF 4.01) as an OASIS standard for the definition of the components, operations and messages of a court filing system in Mai 2013. In April 2019, the committee has adopted in a first step of its standardization process a new version of the specifications, ECF 5.0, as well as the specifications of a compliant web service profile.

== See also ==
- Akoma Ntoso
- LexML Brasil (the only officially in use Legal XML inheritance)
- Electronic court filing
