= URI Template =

A URI Template is a way to specify a URI that includes parameters that must be substituted before the URI is resolved. It was standardized by RFC 6570 in March 2012.

The syntax is usually to enclose the parameter in Braces ({example}). The convention is for a parameter to not be Percent encoded unless it follows a Question Mark (?).

== Examples ==
- http://example.com/people/{firstName}-{lastName}/SSN
- http://example.com/query{?firstName,lastName}

If we were building these URIs for Björk with firstName=Björk and lastName=Guðmundsdóttir they would be:

- http://example.com/people/Björk-Guðmundsdóttir/SSN
- http://example.com/query?firstName=Bj%c3%b6rk&lastName=Gu%c3%b0mundsd%c3%b3ttir

== See also ==
- European Legislation Identifier (URI template is used by ELI)
