= Monica Palmirani =

Italian legal informatics scholar and professor

- Monica Palmirani
- Education: University of Bologna
- Known for: Co-author of Akoma Ntoso; OASIS Distinguished Contributor
- Awards: OASIS Distinguished Contributor (2015)
- Scientific career
- Fields: Legal informatics, Semantic Web, Artificial intelligence and law
- Workplaces: University of Bologna

Monica Palmirani is an Italian legal informatics scholar and full professor of Legal Informatics and ICT Law at the University of Bologna, Department of Legal Studies, where she is a member of the CIRSFID-AlmaAI research centre (Centre for Research in the History, Philosophy, and Sociology of Law and in Computer Science and Law). She is best known as co-author of the Akoma Ntoso legal XML standard and for her leadership roles within the OASIS open standards consortium.

== Education ==
Palmirani graduated in Mathematics and subsequently completed a PhD in Legal Informatics and IT Law at the University of Bologna.

== Career ==
Palmirani has taught Legal Informatics, eGovernment, Legal Drafting Techniques, and Legal XML at the University of Bologna since 2001. She is a full professor in the Department of Legal Studies, with her academic discipline classified under Philosophy of Law.

Together with Fabio Vitali, she co-developed the core vocabulary of Akoma Ntoso, an international XML-based standard for representing parliamentary, legislative, and judiciary documents, which began as a UN/DESA project in 2004. Akoma Ntoso was adopted as an OASIS standard in 2018 under the name LegalDocML.

Within OASIS, Palmirani serves as co-chair of the LegalDocML Technical Committee and the LegalRuleML Technical Committee, and is a member of the LegalXML Steering Committee. In 2015, OASIS named her an OASIS Distinguished Contributor for her exceptional contribution to legal standardisation models. From 2016 to 2018, she served on the OASIS Board of Directors.

Palmirani is Director of the Erasmus Mundus International PhD Programme "Law, Science and Technology", which has also been supported by Marie Skłodowska-Curie Actions fellowships. She is also Director of the Summer School on Legislative XML, held annually at the University of Bologna's Ravenna campus, which trains public administration professionals in the use of legal XML standards.

She has been a visiting researcher at Stanford University's CodeX Center for Legal Informatics on multiple occasions (2009, 2010, 2017), and at NICTA in Brisbane, Australia (2009). She is a member of the executive committee of the International Association for Artificial Intelligence and Law (IAAIL), and President of the Italian Association of Legal Informatics (Società Italiana di Informatica Giuridica).

In 2022, Palmirani was awarded a €2.4 million grant from the European Research Council as Principal Investigator of the HyperModeLex project, which investigates the use of artificial intelligence and data analytics to support the legislative drafting process while preserving democratic and constitutional principles.

In July 2024, a research consortium coordinated by Palmirani won a prize at the Camera dei Deputati (Italian Chamber of Deputies) for the GENAI4LEX-B project, which developed generative AI tools to support parliamentary work, including analysis and drafting of legislation.

Palmirani has acted as consultant to numerous international bodies including UN/DESA, the European Parliament, the Food and Agriculture Organization (FAO), the Senate of Italy, the Chamber of Deputies of Italy, and the Swiss Federal Council.

== Research ==
Palmirani's principal research areas are Legislative XML, legal ontologies, norm modelling, eGovernment, and the application of artificial intelligence to law. She is co-author of Akoma Ntoso, CEN MetaLex, and NormeInRete legal document standards. She has published over 100 articles, books, and book chapters and has been cited approximately 3,700 times according to Google Scholar. She has served as project manager for more than ten European research projects, including ICT4LAW, Estrella, EuCases, Lynx, and FAST-LISA.

== Awards and recognition ==
- OASIS Distinguished Contributor (2015)
- European Research Council Advanced Grant, HyperModeLex project (2022)
