= Integrated Electronic Litigation System =

Initiative by the Singapore Judiciary

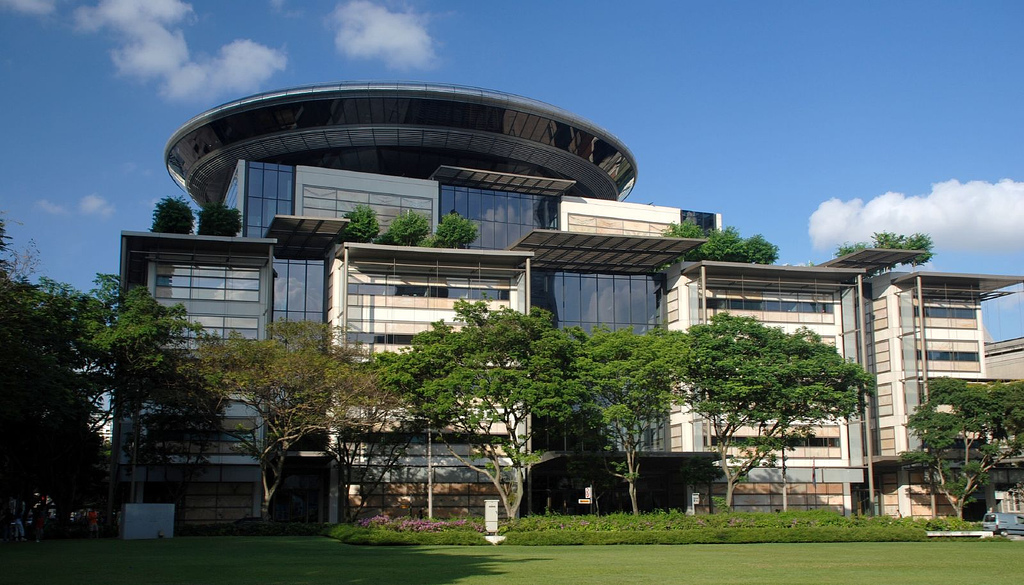
The Supreme Court of Singapore

The Integrated Electronic Litigation System (iELS) or eLitigation (eLit) is an initiative by the Singapore Judiciary to replace the existing Electronic Filing System (EFS) which has been in use since 2000. EFS was conceived and developed in the mid- to late-1990s, and iELS represents the second phase in implementing technology to enhance the litigation process in Singapore.

== Introduction ==
1. Launched in January 2013 in Supreme Court of Singapore; a culmination of nearly 5 years of public sector and private sector partnership.
2. Two other launches expected before the end of 2013 to bring the Subordinate Courts and Family Court into the eLitigation family.
3. Paradigm shift from a document-centric electronic filing system to a case-centric electronic litigation system.
4. Two sides of the same coin: Front-End case management for law firms which is a near mirror image of the Back-End case management for the Courts.
5. Transparent to the public but the new Back-End in the Courts consolidated disparate systems for a more holistic case management and oversight throughout its lifecycle.
6. The simplification of Courts processes coupled with use of electronic forms and enabling of online collaboration between law firms and clients through the online case file is another key evolution in the electronic litigation framework.
7. Use of open standards with functionality delivered through commonly used browsers like Microsoft Internet Explorer, Mozilla Firefox, and even Google Chrome to law firms, service bureaus, and others who need to do court filings.

== See also ==
- Electronic court filing
- Electronic Filing System
- Integrated Criminal Case Filing And Management System - ICMS
