= FRSAD =

Conceptual entity-relationship model

Functional Requirements for Subject Authority Data (FRSAD), previously known as Functional Requirements for Subject Authority Records (FRSAR), is a conceptual entity-relationship model developed by the International Federation of Library Associations and Institutions (IFLA) and published in 2010. It is a continuation of the work done on the FRBR model, detailing how "entities that serve as subjects of intellectual or artistic endeavor" can be related and controlled within the bibliographic universe. The model is intended to support global sharing and reuse of subject authority data.

== The conceptual model ==
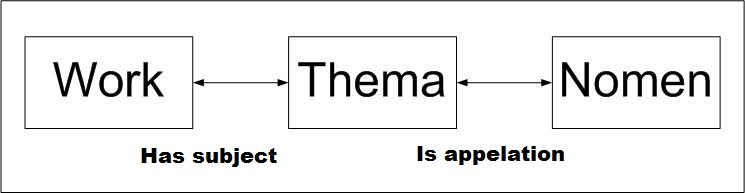

=== Work ===
Work is a "distinct intellectual or artistic creation (IFLA 1998).

=== Thema ===
Is anything that can be the subject of a work. This is the abstract idea of the aboutness of a given work. Thema is independent of language and disciplines (FRSAR 2007).

=== Nomen ===
Any alphanumeric, sound, visual, or any other symbol, sign or combination of symbols by which a thema is known, referred to or addressed (FRSAR 2007). A nomen can be any expression of a thema. Ideally there will exist an authority file with every possible subject/thema. This means that it should be possible to exchange subject authority data between systems. If a user looks up a specific subject in a catalog and wants to look in other places, he or she should not have to worry about translating the query, since the system would be able to recognize the underlying thema and automatically translate it into the relevant nomen. One way to understand this is to think about how a subject can be described in different ways. For example, if one looks at a work about the city Stockholm, the capital of Sweden, there are many ways to describe Stockholm. First, one must distinguish between the city Stockholm and the many other meanings of the word; for example, Stockholm is also the name of other cities, a record label, and a syndrome. When the thema is established in an authority file, it is possible to translate across systems. The nomen for Stockholm could be anything from "Stockholm", "Stockholm (City)", "Tukholma" - the Finnish spelling of Stockholm - or a range of Zip-codes, or the longitude and latitude, or a picture of the city, or a sound. FRSAR, if implemented, enables users to perform specific and precise subject searching across multiple systems.

== Relationships ==
Works and themas have a many-to-many relationship, meaning that any work can have more than one subject, and any subject can be expressed in one or more works. The same is true for the relationship between thema and nomen. A thema can be expressed in many different ways and a nomen can express many different themas, all depending on the given system. Besides these relationships, the workgroup has so far identified several other thema-thema and nomen-nomen relationships. Two nomens can, for example, be said to have an equivalence relationship, if they both are appellations of the same thema.

== User tasks ==
The workgroup conducted two user studies in 2006 and 2007, and based on the results of these studies, four subject authority data user tasks were defined:

Find: to find an entity (thema or nomen) or set of entities corresponding to stated criteria

Identify: to identify an entity (thema or nomen) based on certain attributes / characteristics

Select: to select an entity (thema or nomen)

Explore: to explore any relationships between entities (thema or nomen), correlations to other subject vocabularies and structure of a subject domain

== See also ==
- Functional Requirements for Authority Data
- FRBRoo
- IFLA Library Reference Model
