= Electronic Filing System =

The Electronic Filing System (or EFS) is the Singapore Judiciary's electronic platform for filing and service of documents within the litigation process. In addition, it provides the registries of the Supreme Court and the Subordinate Courts with an electronic registry and workflow system; and an electronic case file. Recent enhancements have added a module which facilitates the conduct of hearing using documents that have been electronically filed.

The EFS provides the legal profession with a rudimentary online case file from which documents can be electronically filed with the courts or served on the other parties in a case. The EFS is also the source for electronic cause book searches that are provided through the Litigation module of LawNet. EFS is set to be replaced by iELS eventually.

== An Overview of the Electronic Filing System ==
The Electronic Filing System (EFS) was implemented by the Singapore Judiciary to provide a platform for Law Firms (LFs) to file documents to the Courts electronically over the Internet. The EFS was specifically designed to fully exploit the electronic super highway to minimise not just the physical movement of people and paper court documents from LFs to the Courts, but also to leverage the benefits of electronic storage within the Courts: i.e. faster document filing and retrieval, eradication of the misplacement of case files, concurrent access to view the same case filed by different parties, etc.

Within the Courts, the EFS allows electronic documents to be automatically routed to the appropriate registry staff for processing. The system allows further routing within the courts e.g. for approvals by the Duty Registrar and a reply is then sent out by the Registry staff which is routed back to the originating LF. This has enabled realisations of improvements in efficiency by minimising paper flow to shorten case processing time. Fees payable by the LFs for filing documents to Court are deducted automatically by the EFS. The whole process is fast, convenient and efficient.

For the LFs, the EFS provides an electronic case file showing hearing dates and documents file by them, served on them or received from the Courts. It also provides an electronic platform for the service of documents on other LFs. The EFS also allows for faster response as well as accurate and up-to-date information. Hence, other benefits of the EFS include the speedy inspection of documents electronically and the ability to request for and receive electronic extracts of documents via the Internet. Electronic cause book searches and legal research are also available through LawNet. Lawyers can even obtain details of hearing fixtures via Short Messaging System (SMS) using their mobile phones.

Within the court room, registrars make use of the EFS to conduct hearings in chambers electronically using the EFS.

=== The components of EFS ===
The EFS consists of the following components:

- The Front-End (FE) accessed via the Internet from each ‘EFS ready’ Law Firm’s desktop.
- A Gateway (GW) that receives submissions from the LFs or the replies from the Courts, routes it to the appropriate party and computes the fees payable by the LF for the transaction.
- The Courts’ Workflow (WF) application that resides on Courts’ computers and caters for the internal routing and workflow processes within the courts.
- A Hearing Module that is used to conduct hearings electronically.
- A stand-alone Key Management System (KMS)

=== Front End Application ===
The EFS FE is a web based solution that LFs access from their PCs via the Internet. A LF needs to register in order to gain access. Upon registration, the LF would be issued with smart cards containing the digital certificates from the Court’s Certification Authority. The FE provides LFs with an online case file through which they can view the documents which have been filed by them, served on them or replied from the Courts. Upcoming hearing dates are also pushed through the EF at the law firm level and at the case level. The FE’s File-n-Serve feature facilitates service of documents on other parties in the case with one click of the mouse.

Documents are transmitted in Portable Document Format (PDF). To file or serve a document, the LF has to fill up the appropriate online template in the FE and attach the document to be filed or served in PDF format. The entire submission may consist of one or several documents and this is digitally signed using the smart card issued upon registration in order to ensure authenticity and non-repudiation.

=== The Gateway ===
When the LF files a document to the Court, the submission is actually received by the GW which then performs certain validations, computes the fees to be charged and identifies to which user department the submission is to be routed to. Replies from the Court are received by the GW and routed to the correct LF for retrieval. The GW performs the following crucial functions: (a) Automated validation checks when documents are filed; (b) Implementation of certain special rules; (c) Automated routing of submissions into Courts’ in-trays; (d) Computation of stamp and other filing fees; (e) Exchange of information between the Back End and the Front End.

=== Court’s Workflow Application ===
The business logic of the courts is built into this application. It encapsulates workflow routing, document management and statistical report generation; documents are stored in a jukebox. An electronic case file allows the easy retrieval of documents; and an upcoming enhancement will collate and present information relating to a case file within a single easy to use interface.

=== Hearing Module ===
The Hearing Module is customised to allow registrars and judges to make use of the EFS to conduct paper-less hearings in chambers. The Hearing Module pre-fetches the entire case file of hearings fixed before a registrar to the local PC to allow quick recall of documents. Dual screens are deployed to allow the viewing of the case file and minute sheets on one screen and the viewing of documents on the other. The Pack-n-Go feature allows registrars and judges to download all the documents in a case file onto a thumb drive for reading at home.

=== Key Management System ===
The Courts operates as an independent Certification Authority which issues digital certificates on smart cards to LFs. The Key Management System (KMS), which is central to this function, comprises the following components: (a) A Certificate Authority Management System used to issue and revoke digital certificates; (b) A Certificate Server that centrally stores the digital certificates; (d) A web-based Certificate Client System which LFs use to manage smart cards issued to them and to request for and receive digital certificates which are then stored in the smart cards; and (e) A web-based Key Generating Software which LF use to generate their private–public key pair.

== Implementation History ==
=== Initial planning (1990 to 1997) ===
The early 1990s saw a number of technological initiatives that would eventually pave the way for the development of the EFS.

The LawNet information service, which originally provided a single database of statutes for the legal profession, was launched in 1990. The operation of LawNet and other related technological developments was under the purview of the LawNet Council (the predecessor of the present LawNet Management Committee). From a basic legal research service, LawNet was eventually expanded between 1992 and 1997 into a comprehensive network of computer services for the legal sector, comprising six modules covering major areas of legal practice:

- Litigation
- Conveyancing
- Corporate Law
- Intellectual Property
- Legal Research
- Integrated Law Office.

A Judicial Administration computerisation programme was completed in 1994. Under this programme, a comprehensive network infrastructure was put in place to support various applications, including connectivity to external systems. An Electronic Bulletin Board was also set up to facilitate communication through electronic means as a step towards the paperless office environment.

In 1995, the first Technology Court was launched. The Technology Court featured digital recording and transcription of proceedings, as well as facilities for the multimedia presentation of evidence. A Remote Chamber Hearing System was also launched to enable members of the legal profession to have ex parte matters heard via desktop video conferencing, and a Judicial Officer’s Bulletin Board was set up as part of the incremental shift towards a paperless court system.

As the cornerstone of a new electronic paperless case management system, the Electronic Filing System (EFS) initiative was first proposed to the LawNet Council in 1995. Under the proposed EFS, law firms would be able to file their suits and submit documents through an electronic data interchange. In addition to electronic filing, the proposed EFS was to incorporate an electronic case document extract service, allow for electronic service of documents, and provide for a comprehensive electronic information service.

=== Phases of Implementation (1997 to 2004) ===
==== Phase 1.0 (8 March 1997) ====
Phase 1.0 of the EFS was launched on 8 March 1997 as a pilot programme with voluntary participation for lawyers. The scope of implementation was limited to only certain aspects of writs of summons. The purpose of this pilot phase was to enable planners to benefit from the lessons learnt in order to fine-tune subsequent phases of implementation.

==== Phase 1.2 (1 March 2000) ====
Phase 1.2 of the EFS was launched on 1 March 2000. Mandatory e-filing to the courts was introduced, and the scope of EFS was expanded to cover most aspects of writs of summons and their corresponding workflow systems. A service bureau was also set up to cater to those law firms that were not yet EFS-equipped at this stage.

==== Phase 2 (2 July 2001) ====
Phase 2 of the EFS was launched on 2 July 2001. This phase saw the introduction of a web-based front-end interface for EFS users, a full-text Electronic Index Search and Extract Service, and an Electronic Service of Documents Facility. The Electronic Index Search and Extract Service allowed law firms to search an electronic case file index and request the extraction of soft copies or certified true copies of case documents. Under the Electronic Service of Documents Facility, law firms were allowed to electronically serve documents on other EFS-ready law firms.

==== Phase 3 (18 December 2001) ====
Phase 3 of the EFS was launched on 18 December 2001. The scope of EFS was expanded to include originating summons, appeals to the Court of Appeal, District Court appeals, taxation of costs, interpleader, and the admission of advocates & solicitors.

==== Phase 4A (28 May 2002) ====
Phase 4A of the EFS was launched on 28 May 2002. The scope of EFS was expanded to include more forms of civil proceedings such as admiralty matters, originating motions, originating petitions, originating summons in bankruptcy, bankruptcy petitions, petitions of course, companies winding-up, power of attorney, and probate (Supreme Court).

==== Phase 4B(i) (9 December 2002) ====
Phase 4B(i) of the EFS was launched on 9 December 2002. This phase saw the inclusion of applications for adoption petitions under the EFS, namely, the auto-generation of adoption petitions in the Family Court using information provided in the form of an electronic data items template.

==== Phase 4B(ii) (15 December 2003) ====
Phase 4B(ii) of the EFS was launched on 15 December 2003. In the Family Court, the scope of EFS was expanded to include petitions for divorce under the Women's Charter (Cap 353, 1997 Rev Ed) and originating summonses under the Guardianship of Infants Act (Cap 122, 1985 Rev Ed), the Women's Charter, the Administration of Muslim Law Act (Cap 3, 1999 Rev Ed) and the Supreme Court of Judicature Act (Cap 322, 1999 Rev Ed). The scope of EFS was also expanded to cover probate and administration proceedings in the Subordinate Courts, and procedures were enhanced in respect of probate and administration proceedings in the Supreme Court.

==== Phase 5 (22 December 2004) ====
Phase 5 of the EFS was implemented in several sub-phrases between July 2003 and December 2004, and was deemed commissioned on 22 December 2004. Under this phase, EFS was extended to the Corporate Services Department of the Supreme Court. Data contained within the existing mainframe-based civil system was migrated to the EFS. In addition, the ability to generate statistical reports was added to the EFS.

==== Phase 6 (10 January 2005) ====
Phase 6 of the EFS was implemented on 10 January 2005. The scope of EFS was expanded to encompass criminal matters in the Supreme Court, including: preliminary inquiries, criminal cases, criminal appeals to the Court of Appeal, criminal revision proceedings, criminal reference proceedings, magistrates’ appeals, criminal motions, and show cause proceedings.

== The EFS Review ==
In April 2003, The Honourable the Chief Justice appointed an EFS Review Committee to conduct a thorough appraisal of the EFS. This review would ensure the system’s continuing relevance, in tandem with the development of technology and the evolving needs of the legal profession. The EFS Review Committee made certain recommendations for improvements to the EFS, which were accepted by The Honourable the Chief Justice.

The EFS Review Implementation Committee (ERIC) was established in August 2003 to implement the recommendations made by the EFS Review Committee. ERIC was to oversee the development of a new Electronic Litigation System to take the place of the current EFS. This system would capitalise on the experience garnered from the current EFS as well as harness projected new and improved technology for the new electronic case management system. In this regard, ERIC was to develop a Roadmap Paper charting the direction of the new Electronic Litigation System, as well as co-ordinate with the Rules Committee to review and modernise the Rules of Court.

The first project which ERIC undertook was the organisation of the Electronic Litigation Colloquium, held on 17 April 2004 at The Sentosa Spa & Resort (formerly known as The Beaufort). The aim of the colloquium was to provide a platform for the stakeholders in the EFS to get together and canvass their views and ideas as to what the new landscape for electronic litigation in Singapore should look like. Representatives from the bench, the bar, IT vendors and the InfoComm Development Authority of Singapore (IDA) were invited to the Colloquium, in order to obtain a good representation from the various stakeholders of the litigation process.

Subsequently, a Select Group was set up to draft the Roadmap Paper and come up with a blueprint to pave the way for the development of the new Electronic Litigation System.

== The Electronic Litigation Roadmap ==
In the course of discussions, it was decided that the appropriate terminology for the new system was the “Electronic Litigation Systems” (ELS) since the interoperability of different systems would be necessary in order to cater for the myriad of new features in the ELS.

The Roadmap Paper is broadly divided into two main sections. The first section describes the functionalities that the ELS will provide. The second part addresses certain corollary issues following from the first section. The structure of the Roadmap Paper is as follows:

Part I: Functionalities of the ELS (a) Case management for law firms; (b) Case management for the courts; and (c) Electronic hearings.

Part II: Corollary considerations (a) Reviewing the litigation process; (b) Costs and business models; and (c) Open technical standards for integration and interoperability.

== The Electronic Litigation Roadmap Public Consultation ==
Following the first publication of the Electronic Litigation Roadmap on 10 January 2005, there was a period of Public Consultation whereby the courts, law firms, government departments and IT vendors were invited to give their feedback on the ideas mooted in the ELS Roadmap. To this end, the ELS Roadmap Paper was published on the websites of the Supreme Court, the Subordinate Courts, the Singapore Academy of Law and LawNet.

There were a heartening number of responses, with a balanced distribution of comments from the stakeholders involved. The responses were generally supportive of the ideas that were proposed in the ELS Roadmap Paper, providing pertinent – and at times, very detailed – observations and comments on the various concepts contained therein.

At the close of the Public Consultation, the Electronic Litigation Roadmap was revised accordingly to incorporate the relevant responses received. ERIC was also reconstituted to form the ELS Committee in May 2005. It is envisaged that in the course of implementing the ELS, focus group discussions will be conducted to seek feedback on specific aspects of the ELS. At the same time, reviews of the ELS will be sought from the various stakeholders at appropriate intervals during the process of implementation.

== See also ==
- Electronic court filing
- Integrated Electronic Litigation System
