= CIDOC Conceptual Reference Model =

Knowledge representation language

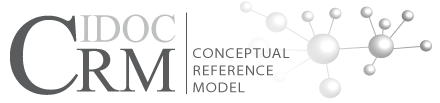
The CRM logo.

The CIDOC Conceptual Reference Model (CRM) provides an extensible ontology for concepts and information in cultural heritage and museum documentation. It is the international standard (ISO 21127:2023) for the controlled exchange of cultural heritage information. Galleries, libraries, archives, museums (GLAMs), and other cultural institutions are encouraged to use the CIDOC CRM to enhance accessibility to museum-related information and knowledge.

== History ==
The CIDOC CRM emerged from the CIDOC Documentation Standards Working Group (DSWG) in the International Committee for Documentation of the International Council of Museums. Initially, until 1994, the work focused on developing an entity-relationship model for museum information, however, in 1996, the approach shifted to object-oriented modeling methodologies, resulting in the first "CIDOC Conceptual Reference Model (CRM)" in 1999. The process of standardizing the CIDOC CRM began in 2000 and was completed in 2006 with its acceptance as the ISO 21127 standard. The standard was updated and a revised edition was published in 2023.

CIDOC CRM conceptualisation

== Aims ==
The overall aim of the CIDOC CRM is to provide a reference model and information standard that museums, and other cultural heritage institutions, can use to describe their collections, and related business entities, to improve information sharing.

The CIDOC Conceptual Reference Model (CRM) provides definitions and a formal structure for describing the implicit and explicit concepts and relationships used in cultural heritage documentation...to promote a shared understanding of cultural heritage information by providing a common and extensible semantic framework that any cultural heritage information can be mapped to. It is intended to be a common language for domain experts and implementers to formulate requirements for information systems and to serve as a guide for good practice of conceptual modelling. In this way, it can provide the "semantic glue" needed to mediate between different sources of cultural heritage information, such as that published by museums, libraries and archives.

By adopting formal semantics for the CIDOC CRM, the pre-conditions for machine-to-machine interoperability and integration have been established. Thus, CIDOC CRM is well placed to become an important information standard and reference model for Semantic Web initiatives, and serves as a guide for data, or database, modeling more generally. Technically speaking, CIDOC CRM lends itself to software applications that extensively use XML and RDF. Many cultural heritage institutions are investigating or building applications that use CIDOC CRM.

Following the successful standardization of the CIDOC CRM, a new initiative, FRBRoo, was begun in 2006 to harmonize it with the Functional Requirements for Bibliographic Records (FRBR). The aim of this initiative is to "provide a formal ontology intended to capture and represent the underlying semantics of bibliographic information and to facilitate the integration, mediation, and interchange of bibliographic and museum information."

== Ontology ==
The "CIDOC object-oriented Conceptual Reference Model" (CRM) is a domain ontology, but includes its own version of an upper ontology.

The core classes cover:

Space-Time
includes title/identifier, place, era/period, time-span, and relationship to persistent items
Events
includes title/identifier, beginning/ending of existence, participants (people, either individually or in groups), creation/modification of things (physical or conceptional), and relationship to persistent items
Material Things
includes title/identifier, place, the information object the material thing carries, part-of relationships, and relationship to persistent items
Immaterial Things
includes title/identifier, information objects (propositional or symbolic), conceptional things, and part-of relationships

Examples of definitions:

Persistent Item
a physical or conceptional item that has a persistent identity recognized within the duration of its existence by its identification rather than by its continuity or by observation. A Persistent Item is comparable to an endurant.
Temporal Entity
includes events, eras/periods, and condition states which happen over a limited extent in time, and is disjoint with Persistent Item. A Temporal Entity is comparable to a perdurant.
Propositional Object
a set of statements about real or imaginary things.
Symbolic Object
a sign/symbol or an aggregation of signs/symbols.

== CIDOC CRM Implementations and Systems ==
- The CIDOC CRM has been implemented in RDF as CIDOC-CRM implementation in RDF.
- The ECRM (and thus CIDOC CRM) is used extensively in the WissKI system, an ontology based virtual research environment for managing primary research data in the area of cultural heritage as linked data.
