= LexML Brasil =

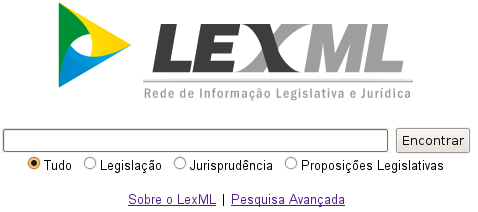
www.LexML.gov.br (search engine) projeto.lexml.gov.br (project description)

LexML Brasil (or LexML-BR or LexML Brazil) is a project of Brazil's Electronic Government initiative. Its objective is to establish open data systems, integrate work processes and share data, in the context of identifying and structuring executive, legislative and judiciary documents. The LexML-BR standards define a set of simple technology-neutral electronic protocols and representations, based on XML and HTTP ecossistem.

While the project was officially launched on June 30, 2009, Brazil has been participating in the LexML community since 2006. In 2009, LexML became an explicit national data standard in the "pt:e-PING".

In May, 2012, Brazil's "Public Access to Information" law (Lei de Acesso a Informações Públicas) entered into force, which strengthened the standing of LexML as a transparency tool that could assist in carrying out the obligation to publish government data in the areas of legislative and court documents.

== Schema ==
LexML's technical standards allow efficient handling of an enormous quantity of legislative and court information available in Brazil. These include:

- XML Schema of the full text of laws (in accordance with LCP-95). Technical Norm "LexML-BR Part 3".
- URN Lex schema, for reference to and nomenclature of the norms. Technical norm "LexML-BR Parte 2"
- OAI-PMH protocol for the exchange and centralization of metadata. Technical norm "LexML-BR Part 4".

== Dedicated resources ==
The main resources needed for the project are already in place:

- Permanent URLs (PURL) for the URN resolvers: Wayback Machine
- Website search engine for laws, LexML Brasil: Rede de Informação Legislativa e Jurídica. Site specialized in laws, decrees, agreements and bills, among other documents at the federal, state and municipal level in all of Brazil.
- A toolset for the production and conversion of documents into specified formats.

== History ==
An early development at Brazil occurred at 1997, in a scholar initiative, with the modeling of the structure of Brazilians legislative documents, and the demonstration that all legislative documents can be automatically translated to HTML hypertext, with intra and inter links. The seminal algorithms (implemented as Perl scripts and regular expressions) was lost one decade, rediscovered during the development of an important LexML tool, the lexml-linker. Some scholar studies continued, and served as support to redirect the initial LexML-BR focus on XML schemas to metadata and URN schemas.

The LexML-BR Project was started in ~2006, and had the LexML-IT as an antecedent, as well public as consultings. On June 30, 2009, it was launched officially.

It is now a joint initiative of many administrative bodies, including Brazil's legislature, executive and judiciary branches, part of the IT Management Community, which combines the areas of legislative and court information.

The goals of the LexML Brazil project can be divided into two main areas:

- LexML 1.0: consists of the search engine, resolver service, generation of persistent identifiers and a "link service".
- LexML 2.0 (from 2010): wider adoption of open source tools for the production of documents, in accordance with the "LexML Brazil XML Schema".

== Motivation ==
Estimatives of law production from 1988 to 2004.
Government level	Documents produced
Municipal	2,522,741
State	956,695
Federal	148,577

In addition to the legal requirements in Brazil for transparency and publication of government documents (see Motivations), the sheer volume of legislation places a premium on digitization and better public access to digital forms of the law.

In 20 years, Brazil has produced approximately:

- federal laws: 150 thousand, an average of 21 per day.
- state laws: 1 million. On average 27 states produce 5 laws per day (135 laws per day total).
- municipal laws: 2.6 million laws, on average each of the 5700 municipalities produce 4 laws per week (360 laws per day in total).

There has been some research identifying this proliferation of laws and bureaucracy as partly responsible for many economic activities going 'underground'.

== See also ==
- Akoma Ntoso
- Lex (URN)
- LexML
