= FRBRoo =

The FRBRoo ("FRBR-object oriented") initiative is a joint effort of the CIDOC Conceptual Reference Model and Functional Requirements for Bibliographic Records international working groups to establish "a formal ontology intended to capture and represent the underlying semantics of bibliographic information and to facilitate the integration, mediation, and interchange of bibliographic and museum information."

== History ==
The idea behind this initiative is that both the library and museum communities would benefit from harmonizing the FRBR and CIDOC reference models to better share library and museum information, particularly in light of the Semantic Web and the overall need to improve the interoperability of digital libraries and museum information management systems. This led to the formation of the International Working Group on FRBR/CIDOC CRM Harmonisation in 2003 with the common goals of "expressing the IFLA FRBR reference model with the concepts, tools, mechanisms, and notation conventions provided by the CIDOC CRM…and aligning (possibly even merging) the two object-oriented models with the aim to contribute to the solution of the problem of semantic interoperability between the documentation structures used for library and museum information."

The first draft of FRBRoo was completed in 2006. The model expresses the attributes and relationships in the entity–relationship model of FRBR, formulated as an extensions of the CIDOC-CRM. Version 2.4 of the FRBRoo model was released in November 2015.

== PRESSoo ==
The ISSN International Centre, the ISSN Review Group, and the Bibliothèque nationale de France developed an extension of the FRBRoo model called PRESSoo in 2013. PRESSoo extends FRBRoo to describe serials and continuing resources. Version 0.1 was released in March 2013 and Version 0.2 was released in December 2013.

PRESSoo's model includes properties and classes that recognize the dynamic nature of serials. The model includes all of the serial relationships in the ISSN Manual. One interesting aspect of PRESSoo is its premise that "there is no single expression or manifestation representing a complete serial work unless the serial work is ended."

== See also ==
- BIBFRAME
- Functional Requirements for Bibliographic Records (FRBR)
