= Cambia (non-profit organisation) =

Australia-based non-profit organization

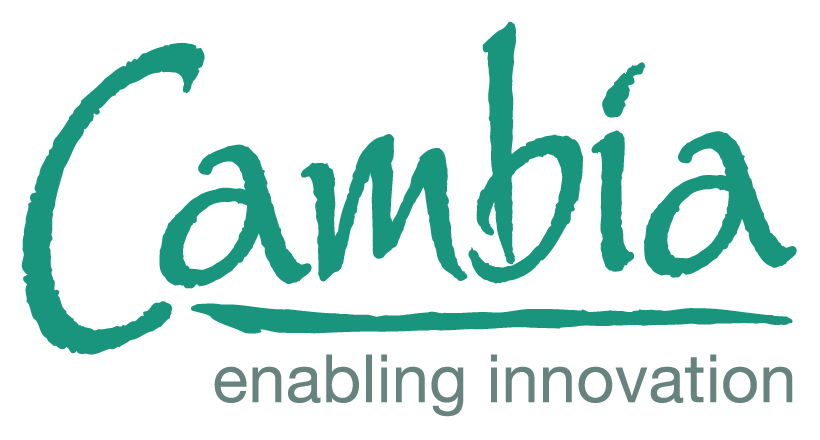
- Founded: 1992
- Founder: Richard Anthony Jefferson
- Type: Non-Governmental Organisation with the Food and Agriculture Organization of the United Nations and WIPO. Not-for-profit organisation with the Australian Securities & Investments Commission.
- Purpose: Open innovation, life sciences, intellectual property
- Location(s): Canberra and Brisbane Australia
- Website: www.cambia.org

Cambia is an Australian-based global non-profit social enterprise focusing on open science, biology, innovation system reform and intellectual property. Its projects include The Lens, formerly known as Patent Lens, and the Biological Innovation for Open Society Initiative.

Cambia derives its name from the Spanish verb cambiar, to change.

== History ==
Cambia was established in 1992 by Richard Anthony Jefferson, a leading molecular biologist responsible for the invention of the GUS reporter system, with substantial early participation by Steven G Hughes, Kate J. Wilson, Andrzej Kilian, Chris A. Fields and Sujata Lakhani. Jefferson describes his vision to found a non-profit organisation in Innovations, to provide more efficient and effective tools to solve the problems of agriculture and society.

In 1992, Cambia relocated to Canberra, Australia from The Netherlands, to oversee and troubleshoot the Rockefeller Foundation's rice biotechnology network in Asia. During this time, Jefferson, Wilson and the growing Cambia team visited hundreds of laboratories to help develop, improve, and apply biotechnology capabilities, particularly pertaining to rice. Cambia offered scientific courses and workshops, and increasing assistance in Intellectual Property management. Cambia's ethic was influenced by Jefferson's early years in enabling technology invention and distribution, but greatly refined through increasing awareness of socially and scientifically complex systems and using new thinking about biological evolution (including the Hologenome Theory of Evolution) as models for institution building and collaboration.

Cambia became one of the first social enterprises to use a hybrid licensing model to fund its public good activities. By selectively patenting important technologies, then creating tiered licensing models for their use, Cambia was able to ensure all parties fair access, but larger licensees would be required to pay more for their non-exclusive use, thus subsidising new developments and distribution and support to less wealthy users, including small enterprises and the public sector in the developing world. This model - developed also by the social entrepreneur David Green for universal access to eye care - is now becoming a pillar of social enterprise function.

Over time Cambia's focus moved away from biotechnology and towards innovation systems and Intellectual Property. The Patent Lens and its successor The Lens are now the primary focus of Cambia. Cambia's goal has always been to enable and democratise innovation and their move towards free and open tools that help people understand intellectual property landscapes is a continuation of those values. In this way they have changed from a wet-science research institute into a strategic system-changing social enterprise. In 2012 and 2013, Cambia was rated among the top 100 best NGOs globally by The Global Journal.

== Projects ==
Cambia's work to freely distribute scientific tools and techniques gave rise to the Biological Open Source (BiOS) Initiative in 2005. Through an open-source biotechnology license and Material Transfer Agreement (MTA) developed in 2005–2007, BiOS sought to establish freedom to operate for innovators by providing and exemplifying legal instruments by which innovators could collaboratively use intellectual property protection as a means to share and jointly improve technology for wider utility. BiOS was built on the back of Jefferson's invention of the GUS-based reporter system and the creation of TransBacter, a work-around for the creation of transgenic plants bypassing the highly patented Agrobacterium genus.

Another of Cambia's projects was the development in 2001 by then Chief Scientist Andrzej Kilian of Diversity Arrays Technology, a solid state sequence agnostic genotyping technology that was spun off into a company, DArT, Pty Ltd to perform agricultural genotyping services to the plant breeding community.

A principal current project of Cambia is the free full-text online patent search and exploration facility and knowledge resource, The Lens (previously the Patent Lens). Launched in 2000 with funding from the Rockefeller Foundation as a US agricultural patent search facility, and substantially expanded in 2005–2007 by a team under the direction of then Deputy CEO Dr. Marie Connett to encompass patent documents from multiple jurisdictions and all domains, and information on the linkages between patent applications and the status of granted patents, the Patent Lens allowed free searching of almost 10 million full-text patent documents. It was distinguished as being the only not-for-profit facility of its kind, with international coverage and integrated links to non-patent literature. The Lens was launched in 2013 as the successor to the Patent Lens, making strides in the visual presentation of patent analysis and workspace management; it is the only global patent site with fully open, shareable, annotatable and re-usable data collections. The Lens now hosts more than 111.5 million patent records and over 60.6 million patent families from over 95 different jurisdictions, including European Patent Office (EPO), United States Patent and Trademark Office (USPTO), IP Australia, World Intellectual Property Organization (WIPO).

The Lens also features an open biological patent facility, PatSeq, initiated in 2006 by Connett with Neil Bacon of the Lens IP/IT team, funded by the government of Norway via the International Rice Research Institute and collaborating with US NIH, to prepare detailed analytic landscapes of sequences described or claimed in patents or patent applications, from the human genome (2007) and rice and Arabidopsis genomes (2008), with the purpose of rendering the trends in gene patenting more transparent. Further development later led by Professor Osmat Jefferson, gave rise to additional advanced tools for searching and analysing biological sequences found in patents and patent applications. The facility has since mapped sequences disclosed in gene patents and patent applications onto the genomes of mice, maize, soybean and others and enables searching at the genome, gene and individual sequence level. The Lens now hosts more than 287 million biological sequences.

In 2017, Professor Osmat Jefferson directed the launching of Lens influence mapping facilities PatCite and QUT In4M, enabling users to map and measure the influence of scholarly works on invention and innovation. The Lens and its new global In4M Ranking system feature prominently in the Nature Index 2017 Innovation supplement, published in leading science journal Nature and the seminal paper describing the granular metrics and the rankings options was published in the journal Nature Biotechnology. In December 2017, The Lens became more than a patent and sequence facility with the launch of scholarly works search. Initially exposing the scholarly works cited in the patent literature, The Lens now hosts and serves scholarly works from more than 195.5 million scholarly records from multiple sources including Microsoft Academic, Crossref, ORCID, PubMed, Impactstory and CORE.

== Governance ==
Cambia is a social enterprise, and is a registered Non-Governmental Organisation with the Food and Agriculture Organization of the United Nations and a registered observer with the World Intellectual Property Organization. Within Australia, Cambia is registered with the Australian Securities & Investments Commission (ASIC) as a not-for-profit company limited by guarantee.

Cambia's governance is overseen by a Board of Directors, according to its constitution.

== Locations ==
As of July 2012, Cambia operates principally from headquarters in Canberra, ACT, with some staff based in Brisbane, Australia, at the Queensland University of Technology. Before its move to Brisbane in 2008, where it operated for four years, Cambia was located on the Black Mountain research campus of the CSIRO while its glasshouse facilities were housed at the Australian National University campus.
