= Scientific literature =

Literary genre

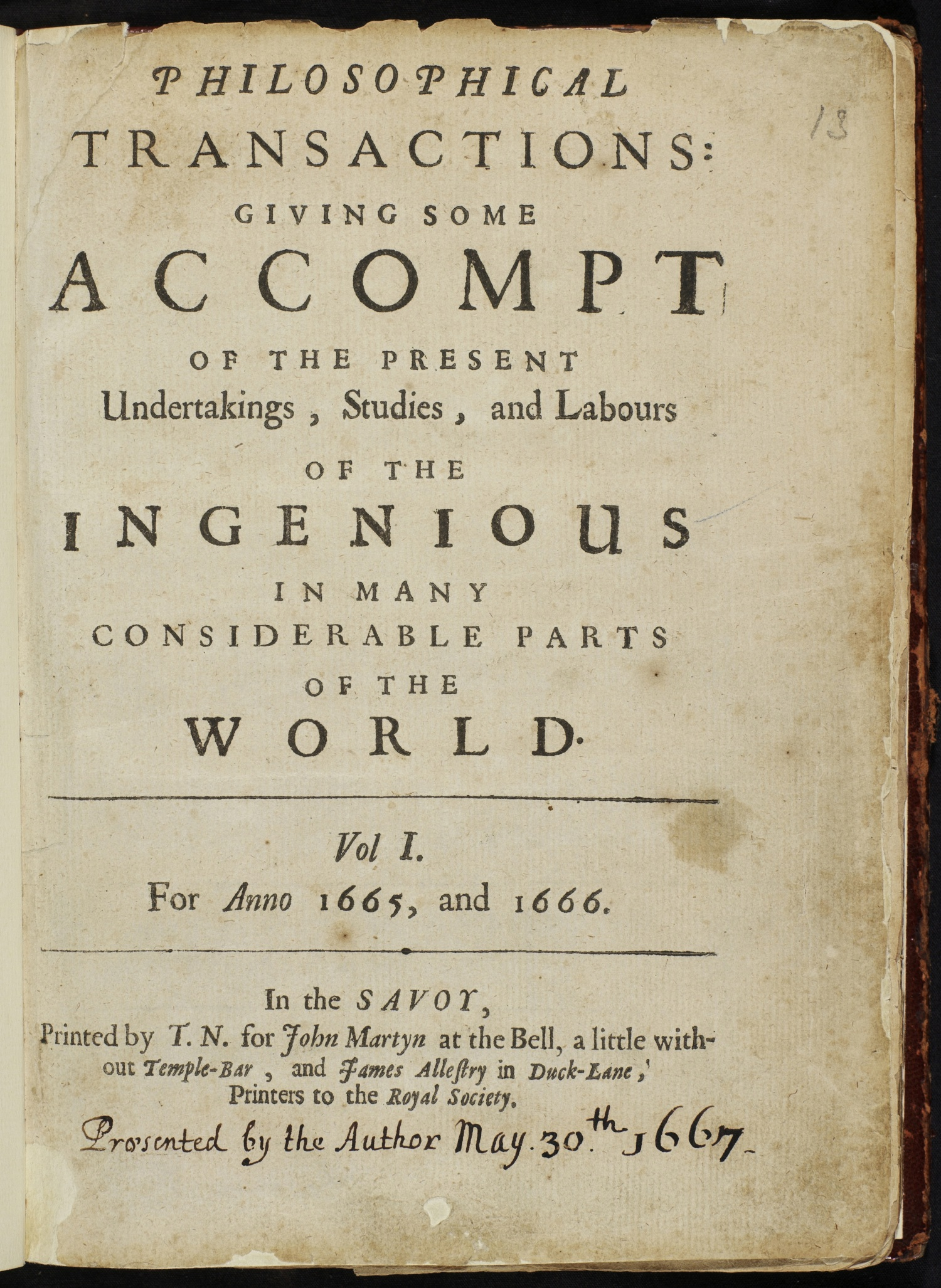
The frontispiece for some early scientific literature published in the Philosophical Transactions of the Royal Society

Scientific literature encompasses a vast body of academic papers that spans various disciplines within the natural and social sciences. It primarily consists of academic papers that present original empirical research and theoretical contributions. These papers serve as essential sources of knowledge and are commonly referred to simply as "the literature" within specific research fields.

The process of academic publishing begins when an author submits a manuscript to a publisher. A researcher may, for example submit, their work to journals or conferences. The first stage after the submission is for the manuscript to undergo review by other experts in the field. This evaluation, known as peer review, aims to ensure quality, validity, and reliability of the research before it becomes part of the scientific literature. Peer-reviewed publications contribute significantly to advancing our understanding of the world and shaping future research endeavors.

Original scientific research first published in scientific journals constitutes primary literature. Patents and technical reports, which cover minor research results and engineering and design efforts, including computer software, are also classified as primary literature.

Secondary sources comprise review articles that summarize the results of published studies to underscore progress and new research directions, as well as books that tackle extensive projects or comprehensive arguments, including article compilations.

Tertiary sources encompass encyclopedias and similar works designed for widespread public consumption.

== Types of scientific publications ==
Scientific literature can include the following kinds of publications:

- Scientific articles published in scientific journals.
- Patents in the relevant subject (for example, biological patents and chemical patents).
- Books wholly written by one author or a few co-authors.
- Edited volumes, where each chapter is the responsibility of a different author or group of authors, while the editor is responsible for determining the scope of the project, keeping the work on schedule, and ensuring consistency of style and content.
- Presentations at academic conferences, especially those organized by learned societies.
- Government reports such as a forensic investigation conducted by a government agency such as the NTSB.
- Scientific publications on the World Wide Web (although e.g. scientific journals are now commonly published on the web).
- Books, technical reports, pamphlets, and working papers issued by individual researchers or research organizations on their own initiative; these are sometimes organized into a series.

Literature may also be published in areas considered to be "grey", as they are published outside of traditional channels. This material is customarily not indexed by major databases and can include manuals, theses and dissertations, or newsletters and bulletins.

The significance of different types of the scientific publications can vary between disciplines and change over time. According to James G. Speight and Russell Foote, peer-reviewed journals are the most prominent and prestigious form of publication. University presses are more prestigious than commercial press publication. The status of working papers and conference proceedings depends on the discipline; they are typically more important in the applied sciences. The value of publication as a preprint or scientific report on the web has in the past been low, but in some subjects, such as mathematics or high energy physics, it is now an accepted alternative.

=== Scientific papers and articles ===
Scientific papers have been categorized into ten types. Eight of these carry specific objectives, while the other two can vary depending on the style and the intended goal.

Papers that carry specific objectives are:

- An original article provides new information from original research supported by evidence and embodies the scientific method.
- Case reports are unique events that researchers read to obtain information on the subject. While a case study may focus on only one case, it can account for context rather than an original research article.
- A technical note is a description of a technique or piece of equipment that has been modified from an existing one to be new and more effective.
- A pictorial essay is a series of high-quality images published for teaching purposes.
- A review is a detailed analysis of recent developments on a topic. Three essential elements of performing a review article are the study's purpose, the selection of documents, and the data assessment method. They are interconnected and shape several categories of literature reviews, including a "narrative review", "descriptive review", "scoping review", "meta-analysis", and so on.
- A commentary is a short summary of an author's personal experience.
- Editorials are short reviews or critiques of original articles.
- Letters to the editor are communications directed to the editor of an article to ask questions and provide constructive criticism.

The following two categories are variable, including for example historical articles and speeches:

- Nonscientific material: This type of material comes from the result of an article being published. It does not advance an article scientifically but instead contributes to its reputation as a scientific article.
- Other: Other types of papers not listed under non-scientific material or in any of the above eight categories. They can vary depending on the objective and style of the article.

== Scientific article ==
=== Preparation ===
The actual day-to-day records of scientific information are kept in research notebooks or logbooks. These are usually kept indefinitely as the basic evidence of the work, and are often kept in duplicate, signed, notarized, and archived. The purpose is to preserve the evidence for scientific priority, and in particular for priority for obtaining patents. They have also been used in scientific disputes. Since the availability of computers, the notebooks in some data-intensive fields have been kept as database records, and appropriate software is commercially available.

The work on a project is typically published as one or more technical reports, or articles. In some fields both are used, with preliminary reports, working papers, or preprints followed by a formal article. Articles are usually prepared at the end of a project, or at the end of components of a particularly large one. In preparing such an article vigorous rules for scientific writing have to be followed.

=== Language ===
Often, career advancement depends upon publishing in high-impact journals, which, especially in hard and applied sciences, are usually published in English. Consequently, scientists with poor English writing skills are at a disadvantage when trying to publish in these journals, regardless of the quality of the scientific study itself. Yet many international universities require publication in these high-impact journals by both their students and faculty. One way that some international authors are beginning to overcome this problem is by contracting with freelance copy editors who are native speakers of English and specialize in ESL (English as a second language) editing to polish their manuscripts' English to a level that high-impact journals will accept.

=== Structure and style ===
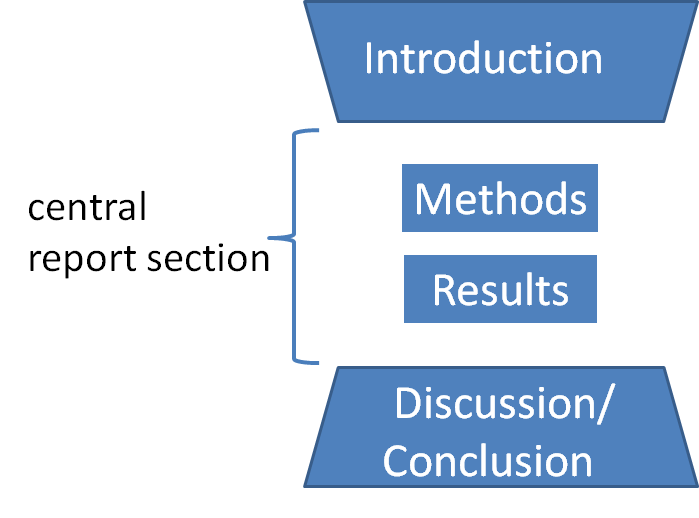
IMRaD structure of Scientific articles according to so called Wineglass model

Although the content of an article is more important than the format, it is customary for scientific articles to follow a standard structure, which varies only slightly in different subjects. Although the IMRAD structure emphasizes the organization of content, and in scientific journal articles, each section (Introduction, Methods, Results, and Discussion) has unique conventions for scientific writing style.

The following are key guidelines for formatting, although each journal etc will to some extent have its own house style:

- The title attracts readers' attention and informs them about the contents of the article. Titles are distinguished into three main types: declarative titles (state the main conclusion), descriptive titles (describe a paper's content), and interrogative titles (challenge readers with a question that is answered in the text). Some journals indicate, in their instructions to authors, the type (and length) of permitted titles.
- The names and affiliations of all authors are given. In the wake of some scientific misconduct cases, publishers often require that all co-authors know and agree on the content of the article.
- An abstract summarizes the work (in a single paragraph or in several short paragraphs) and is intended to represent the article in bibliographic databases and to furnish subject metadata for indexing services.
- The context of previous scientific investigations should be presented, by citation of relevant documents in the existing literature, usually in a section called an "Introduction".
- Empirical techniques, laid out in a section usually called "Materials and Methods", should be described in such a way that a subsequent scientist, with appropriate knowledge of and experience in the relevant field, should be able to repeat the observations and know whether he or she has obtained the same result. This naturally varies between subjects, and does not apply to mathematics and related subjects.
- Similarly, the results of the investigation, in a section usually called "Results", should be presented in tabular or graphic form (image, chart, schematic, diagram or drawing). These display elements should be accompanied by a caption and should be discussed in the text of the article.
- Interpretation of the meaning of the results is usually addressed in a "Discussion" or "Conclusions" section. The conclusions drawn should be based on the new empirical results while taking established knowledge into consideration, in such a way that any reader with knowledge of the field can follow the argument and confirm that the conclusions are sound. That is, acceptance of the conclusions must not depend on personal authority, rhetorical skill, or faith.
- Finally, a "References" or "Literature Cited" section lists the sources cited by the authors.

== Peer review ==
Increasing reliance on digital abstracting services and academic search engines means that the de facto acceptance in the academic discourse is predicted by the inclusion in such selective sources. Commercial providers of proprietary data include Chemical Abstracts Service, Web of Science and Scopus, while open data (and often open source, non-profit and library-led) services include DOAB, DOAJ and (for open access works) Unpaywall (based on CrossRef and Microsoft Academic records enriched with OAI-PMH data from open archives).

== Ethics ==
The transfer of copyright from author to publisher, used by some journals, can be controversial because many authors want to propagate their ideas more widely and re-use their material elsewhere without the need for permission. Usually an author or authors circumvent that problem by rewriting an article and using other pictures. Some publishers may also want publicity for their journal so will approve facsimile reproduction unconditionally; other publishers are more resistant.

In scientific publishing, a number of key issues include and are not restricted to:

- Honesty and integrity is a duty of each author and person, expert-reviewer and member of journal editorial boards.
- The peer review process contributes to quality control and it is an essential step to ascertain the standing and originality of the research.
  - Redundant publications: Publications generally should contain new unpublished material.
  - Data fabrication is the process of purposefully changing data to make the information more in the favor of the author.
- Ethical standards: Recent journal editorials presented some experience of unscrupulous activities.
  - Human welfare concerns: The guidelines for human experimentation started during WWII with the Nuremberg Code. It has evolved into three main principles from The Belmont Report. The subject must be able to make their own choices to protect themselves, benefits must outweigh the risks, and subjects must be evaluated for their selection and benefits must go to all of society.
  - Animal welfare concerns: Is the ethical care of animals in scientific experiments. The APS has set strict guidelines and regulations to stop animals from being unnecessarily harmed in experiments. These are being updated regularly by the APS and is a federal law in the United States enforced by DHHS.
- Authorship: Who may claim a right to authorship? In which order should the authors be listed?
  - Conflicts of interest: This refers to biases due to private interest. It can be done knowingly or not. This is unethical because it makes data inaccurate.
  - Authorship disputes: The authorship of an article is simply the author of the article. The ethical issue with this is when there are two people that believe to be the author, but there is only one true author. There are guidelines to help pick which get authorship of the writing. The one that does not get authorship is put in the acknowledgments. The guidelines come from NIH and The Council of Science Editors.

== History ==
In 1620, Francis Bacon was the first to describe the experimental method in his book Novum Organum. René Descartes was one of the key figures in the Scientific Revolution. He was probably the first to send his texts to colleagues asking their opinions, which became the prototype of peer review. The increased attention to epistemology in the 17th century is also linked to Cartesian views. The first recorded editorial pre-publication peer-review occurred in 1665 by the founding editor of Philosophical Transactions of the Royal Society, Henry Oldenburg. The term "peer review" was first used in the early 1970s. Technical and scientific books were a specialty of David Van Nostrand, and his Engineering Magazine re-published contemporary scientific articles.

== See also ==
- Acknowledgment index
- Citation index
- Digital object identifier
- Grey literature
- Open access (publishing)
- Research paper mill
- Scientific communication
- UKSG
- List of academic databases and search engines
