= Richard Anthony Jefferson =

American molecular biologist (born 1956)

Richard Jefferson
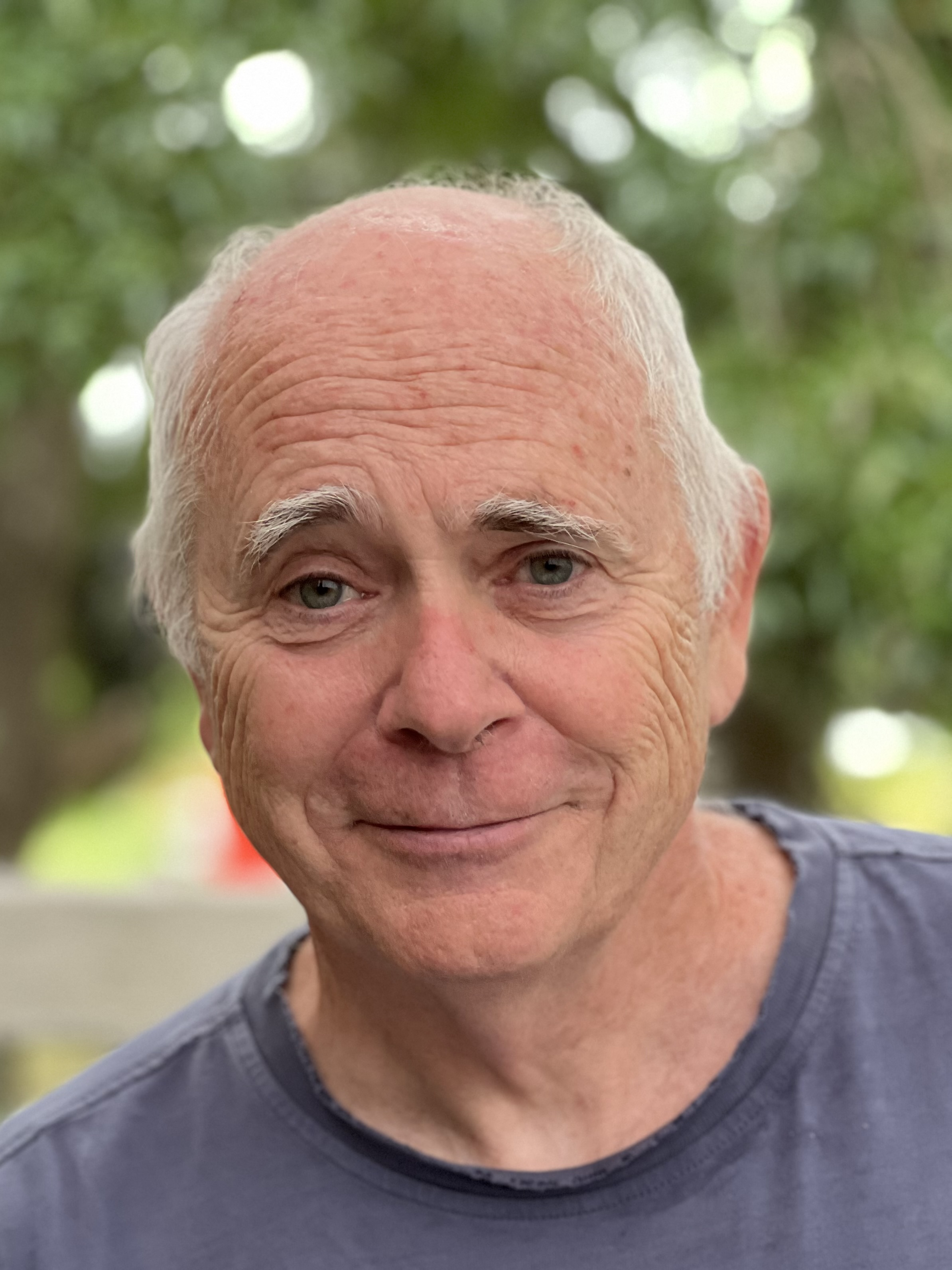
- Richard Jefferson, 2010
- Born: Richard Anthony Jefferson; 1956 (age 69–70); Santa Cruz, California
- Citizenship: United States of America; Australia
- Education: University of California, Santa Barbara (BA); University of Colorado Boulder (PhD)
- Known for: Biological Open Source; Cambia; GUS reporter system; Patent Lens; Hologenome theory of evolution; GURT; First biotech crop; The Lens
- Awards: website = www.cambia.org
- Scientific career
- Workplaces: Queensland University of Technology; Plant Breeding Institute, Cambridge
- Thesis: DNA Transformation of Caenorhabditis elegans Development and Application of a New Gene Fusion System (Cloning, Chimeric, Sequence) (1985)
- Doctoral advisor: David I. Hirsh, William B. Wood

Richard Anthony Jefferson (born 1956) is an American-born molecular biologist and social entrepreneur who developed the widely used reporter gene system GUS, conducted the world's first biotech crop release, proposed the Hologenome theory of evolution, pioneered Biological Open Source and founded The Lens. He is founder of the social enterprise Cambia and a professor of Biological Innovation at the Queensland University of Technology. In 2003, he was named by Scientific American as one of the world's 50 most influential technologists, and is renowned for his work on making science-enabled innovation more widely accessible. He was profiled in 'Open & Shut: The Basement Interviews', and other major media, including in an Economist Feature 'Grassroots Innovator' in 2001.

== Education ==
Born in Santa Cruz, California, Jefferson studied at the University of California, Santa Barbara at the College of Creative Studies, and obtained his BA (Molecular Genetics) in 1978. He then moved to the University of Colorado Boulder for his Ph.D., where he first developed the GUS reporter system, isolating, sequencing and characterizing the first microbial glucuronidase, and creating transgenic technology for Caenorhabditis elegans

== Career ==
As a postdoctoral researcher he worked at the Plant Breeding Institute in Cambridge, England: there he adapted the GUS assay for the use in plants. His GUS system was a breakthrough in plant molecular sciences, useful for the development of efficient transformation methods for crop plants, and cell and developmental biology. In 1986-87, he sent all the components of the GUS system (DNA and strains) together with a comprehensive users' manual to nearly a thousand labs worldwide, before publication, pioneering a biological open source paradigm and a rapid uptake of the technology. The GUS system and its novel mode of dissemination was said to be essential for development of transformation of the most important crops, including soybean, maize, cotton and rice. The work has been cited in the primary literature almost 15,000 times, and has been licensed by every major company in crop genetics.

During his postdoc in Cambridge, he also initiated and managed, with his colleague Michael W. Bevan, the world's first field release of a transgenic food crop (June 1, 1987), in Trumpington, near Cambridge, UK. The planting date of the experiment was serendipitously one day before that of Monsanto, in Jerseyville, Illinois, which has been widely but incorrectly viewed as the first such trial.

In 1989, driven by a need to see the tools of science more broadly accessible and more effectively used in complex environments, Jefferson joined the Food and Agriculture Organization of the United Nations (FAO) as senior scientist, the first molecular biologist in this position. Since then he traveled, worked and taught in many developing countries. He left the organization in 1991 to start a non-profit private social enterprise, Cambia. Cambia soon moved to Australia, due to Jefferson's involvement in the Asian rice biotechnology programs of the Rockefeller Foundation, and the proximity to almost half the world's agricultural population.

In September 1994, Jefferson first articulated the Hologenome Theory of Evolution, at a presentation at Cold Spring Harbor Laboratory, at a Symposium "A Decade of PCR" This theory was developed from his molecular and genetic work on glucuronide metabolism by vertebrate-associated microbes, including the role of glucuronidases, sulfatases and other enzymes in modulating and effecting enterohepatic circulation of steroid hormones. The levels, ratios and timing of steroid hormone de-conjugation (activation) and resorption modulates virtually all aspects of vertebrate ontogeny, physiology and reproduction. The premise for his theory was that natural selection acts on the holobiont comprising a 'scaffold genome' and myriad microbial constituents in diverse ecosystems, selecting for persistence of the set of genetically encoded capabilities.

In January 1997, the hologenome theory was extended, informed by further work on the molecular genetics of enteric microbial glucuronide metabolism, to emphasize the central role of microbially-mediated hormone modulation (MHM) as an essential component of multi-cellularity and vertebrate biology. This led Jefferson to coin the term ecotherapeutics, or ecological therapeutics, stating that a major route to improved performance or health of animals or plants would be through the adjustment of microbial populations and their genetic capabilities (microbiota, often now called the microbiomes).

The development of theory and its logic were also outlined in detail in his blog in 2007, and summarized in a cover article Jan 9, 2013, by Carrie Arnold in New Scientist

In 1999, Jefferson was appointed as Author-in-Chief to the United Nations Convention on Biological Diversity for the landmark study, submitted to the UN General Assembly, on the contentious genetic technology, colloquially called 'Terminator Technology'. In this study, he coined and defined the term GURT - Genetic Use Restriction Technology and its variants.

At Cambia, and with the initial funding and partnership with Rockefeller Foundation's agriculture program, Jefferson and the Cambia staff started to develop key new tools - including the pCambia vectors, released in 1997, and which now are the most widely used plasmids in plant biotechnology.

The continuous distribution of thousands of these tools without restrictions throughout the world, the dozens of conducted training courses, and the newly invented open technologies advanced what would become the Biological Open Source initiative, formally launched in 2005. That year, Jefferson and colleagues published a landmark paper in Nature, in which they described a new biological open source invention, TransBacter.

Agrobacterium-mediated gene transfer was by far the most common tool for agricultural biotechnology, but due to complex and extensive patenting, and aggressive pursuit of dominant patents by Monsanto, the use of the tool was constrained to merely academic pursuits or by use of multinational corporations under license. Using Patent Lens - the most popular global open full-text patent search engine - founded by Jefferson and his colleague Carol Nottenburg in 1999 as CambiaIP Resource - Cambia published the world's first open patent landscape. Using the evidence and clarity obtained from this patent landscape, Jefferson and his colleagues designed and created an effective alternative technology that would not be constrained by any of the existing patents (of which there were by then almost a thousand). The technology, called Transbacter involved using three taxes of benign plant-associated bacteria modified with the gene-transfer components from Agrobacterium, to efficiently transfer genes to diverse crop species. "Transbacter" was made available under the first BiOS (Biological Open Source) license, for free to anyone and sent to hundreds of labs worldwide, and was licensed by public sector, small enterprise and multinationals under open principles, with commitments to share improvements with other licensees. The open patent landscape, initially authored by patent experts Nottenburg and Carolina Roa-Rodriguez and later updated by several other Cambia staff, in addition to many other landscapes serve as prototypes of Jefferson's subsequent initiative; open Innovation Cartography

In 2009, with funding from the Bill & Melinda Gates Foundation, The Lemelson Foundation and the Gordon & Betty Moore Foundation, Jefferson moved with part of Cambia to the Queensland University of Technology (QUT) in Brisbane, Australia, as Professor of Science, Technology & Law, to direct the global activities on open Innovation Cartography.

Known also for his expertise in intellectual property, Jefferson remains active in the promotion of open source biological innovation which has been covered extensively by global media. He served on the World Economic Forum's Global Agenda Council on Intellectual Property for four years, and is on the WEF's Global Agenda Council on the Economics of Innovation. In 2013, Cambia launched The Lens to replace the older Patent Lens and enable broader innovation-focused navigation platforms. Jefferson is considered a global leader in social entrepreneurship and is an Outstanding Social Entrepreneur of the Schwab Foundation, and a plenary speaker at the Skoll World Forum. Jefferson was also a keynote speaker at Consilience 2016, organised by National Law School of India University, Bengaluru on Intellectual Property and the Commons.
