= Microsoft Academic Search =

Former academic search engine

- Website type: Bibliographic database
- Owner: Microsoft
- Website: https://www.microsoft.com/en-us/research/project/academic/
- Commercial: No

Microsoft Academic Search (MAS) was a research project and academic search engine retired in 2012. It relaunched in 2016 as Microsoft Academic, which in turn was shut down in 2022. The content of the latter was allegedly incorporated into The Lens.

== History ==
Microsoft launched a search tool called Windows Live Academic Search in 2006 to directly compete with Google Scholar. It was renamed Live Search Academic after its first year and then discontinued two years later. In 2009, Microsoft Research Asia Group launched a beta tool called Libra in 2009, which was for the purpose of algorithms research in object-level vertical search, data mining, entity linking, and data visualization. Libra was redirected to the MAS service by 2011 and contained 27.2 million records for books, conference papers, and journals.

Although largely functional, the service was not intended to be a production website and ceased to be developed, as was originally intended when the research goals of the project had been met. The service stopped being updated in 2012. The fact that this decline was not reported on earlier indicated to the authors that the service was largely ignored by academics and bibliometricians alike.

In July 2014, Microsoft Research announced that Microsoft Academic was evolving from a research project to a production service, and would be integrating with Microsoft's flagship search engine, Bing, and its intelligent personal assistant service, Cortana. “By growing Microsoft Academic Search from a research effort to production,” [Microsoft Research's Kuansan] Wang says, “our goal is to make Bing-powered Cortana the best personal research assistant for our users".

== See also ==
- Microsoft Academic
- Google Scholar
- CiteSeerX
- List of academic databases and search engines
