= Technology, Education, Management, Informatics =

- Language: English

Publication details
- History: 2012–present
- Publisher: Association for Information Communication Technology Education and Science (Serbia)
- Frequency: Quarterly
- Open access: Yes

Standard abbreviations
- ISO 4: Technol. Educ. Manag. Inform.

Indexing
- ISSN: 2217-8309 (print); 2217-8333 (web)

Links
- Journal homepage

Technology, Education, Management, Informatics (TEM) is a quarterly peer-reviewed academic journal covering technology and business. The journal has a significant impact as evidenced by citations in Google Scholar. It is indexed by Scopus, Web of Science, and other citation indices.

== Publication ==
TEM is published by UIKTEN – Association for Information Communication Technology Education and Science, Serbia. It is open access, and does not require a subscription or registration. All previous issues are accessible online.
