= Results in Chemistry =

- Discipline: Chemistry
- Language: English
- Edited by: Thorfinnur Gunnlaugsson

Publication details
- History: 2019–present
- Publisher: Elsevier
- Frequency: Bimonthly
- Impact factor: 4.2 (2024)

Standard abbreviations
- ISO 4: Results Chem.

Indexing
- CODEN: RCEHB7
- ISSN: 2211-7156
- OCLC no.: 1103229267

Links
- Journal homepage; Online archive

Results in Chemistry is a biannual peer-reviewed scientific journal that covers all areas of chemistry and related fields and is published by Elsevier. It was established in 2019 and the editor-in-chief is Thorfinnur Gunnlaugsson (Trinity College Dublin).

== Abstracting and indexing ==
This journal is abstracted and indexed in Chemical Abstracts Service, Emerging Sources Citation Index, and Scopus. According to the Journal Citation Reports, the journal has a 2024 impact factor of 4.2.
