= ChemRefer =

Pharmaceutical search engine

Chemrefer
- Website type: Search engine
- Available in: English
- Owner: ChemRefer Limited
- Creator: William James Griffiths
- Website: http://www.chemrefer.com
- Commercial: Yes
- Registration: Not Applicable
- Launched: 2006
- Current status: Offline

ChemRefer was a service that allows searching of freely available and full-text chemical and pharmaceutical literature that is published by authoritative sources.

Features included basic and advanced search options, mouseover detailed view, an integrated chemical structure drawing and search tool, downloadable toolbar, customized RSS feeds, and newsletter.

ChemRefer was primarily of use to readers who do not have subscriptions for accessing restricted chemical literature, and to publishers who offer either open access or hybrid open access journals and seek to attract further subscriptions by publicly releasing part of their archive.

== See also ==
- Google Scholar
- Windows Live Academic
- BASE
- PubMed
