= Biological Innovation for Open Society =

- Formation: February 10, 2005
- Founder: Cambia
- Purpose: biological innovation
- Key people: Richard Anthony Jefferson

BiOS (Biological Open Source/Biological Innovation for Open Society) is an international initiative to foster innovation and freedom to operate in the biological sciences. BiOS was officially launched on 10 February 2005 by Cambia, an independent, international non-profit organization dedicated to democratizing innovation. Its intention is to initiate new norms and practices for creating tools for biological innovation, using binding covenants to protect and preserve their usefulness, while allowing diverse business models for the application of these tools.

As described by Richard Anthony Jefferson, CEO of Cambia, the Deputy CEO of Cambia, Dr Marie Connett worked extensively with small companies, university offices of technology transfer, attorneys, and multinational corporations to create a platform to share productive and sustainable technology. The parties developed the BiOS Material Transfer Agreement (MTA) and the BiOS license as legal instruments to facilitate these goals.

== Biological Open Source ==
Traditionally, the term 'open source' describes a paradigm for software development associated with a set of collaborative innovation practices, which ensure access to the end product's source materials - typically, source code. The BiOS Initiative has sought to extend this concept to the biological sciences, and agricultural biotechnology in particular. BiOS is founded on the concept of sharing scientific tools and platforms so that innovation can occur at the 'application layer.' Jefferson observes that, 'Freeing up the tools that make new discoveries possible will spur a new wave of innovation that has real value.' He notes further that, 'Open source is an enormously powerful tool for driving efficiency.'

Through BiOS instruments, licensees cannot appropriate the fundamental kernel of a technology and improvements exclusively for themselves. The base technology remains the property of whichever entity developed it, but improvements can be shared with others that support the development of a protected commons around the technology.

To maintain legal access to the technology, in other words, licensees must agree not to prevent others who have agreed to the same terms from using the technology and any improvements in the development of different products

== BiOS License ==
By making the BiOS license cost-free, Cambia has sought to create 'freedom to innovate' in the scientific community. In lieu of royalties and other restrictions often imposed by legal agreements, the BiOS licenses impose on the licensee conditions to encourage cooperation and development of the technology. To be granted full, unfettered commercial rights to listed technologies, licensees are required to comply with three conditions:

- To share with all BiOS licensees any improvements in the core technologies as defined, for which they seek any Intellectual Property protection.
- To agree to not assert over other BiOS licensees their own or third-party rights that might dominate the defined technologies.
- To agree to share with the public any and all information about the biosafety of the defined technologies.

As with other legal instruments, definitions used in the BiOS licenses are important. The scope and core capabilities of the enabling technologies and platforms should be carefully defined to provide confidence in the development of viable business models surrounding the use of the BiOS license.

The adoption of the BiOS licenses has now extended to over 300 licensees worldwide.

== Material Transfer Agreements (MTAs) ==
BiOS has also issued a series of Material Transfer Agreements (MTAs), a common form of bailment used to provide materials for life sciences research, such as bacterial strains, plant lines, cell cultures, or DNA. MTAs able to be adapted for biological materials are available on the BiOS site.

== Open Source Biological Technologies ==
CambiaLabs engineered two ‘open source’ biological technologies, TransBacter and GUSPlus, which they released under the BiOS Initiative. The first, TransBacter, was designed to work around the intense patenting associated with the making of transgenic plants. Cambia identified that the majority of patents claiming methods for plant transgenics make explicit reference to the bacterium Agrobacterium tumefaciens; therefore, the use of a bacterium outside the genus Agrobacterium would not be subject to existing patent claims. Cambia published its work on TransBacter, which uses bacteria from the genera Rhizobium, Sinorhizobium and Mesorhizobium in 2005 in Nature. TransBacter is available to all non-profit researchers and institutes upon signing a BiOS MTA. For-profit companies are asked to sign a BiOS license and to make a contribution to Cambia which is calculated on the company’s financial means.

An inventory of BiOS-licensed patents is available at the Cambia site.

== See also ==
- Cambia
- GUS reporter system
- Patentleft
- Patent Lens
- Richard Anthony Jefferson
