= Antibody Therapeutics =

- Discipline: Immunology, oncology, antibody engineering
- Language: English
- Edited by: Mitchell Ho

Publication details
- History: Since 2018
- Publisher: Oxford University Press on behalf of the Chinese Antibody Society
- Frequency: Quarterly
- Open access: Yes
- Impact factor: 4.8 (2025)

Standard abbreviations
- ISO 4: Antib. Ther.

Indexing
- CODEN: ATNHAH
- ISSN: 2516-4236
- OCLC no.: 1077386114

Links
- Journal homepage; Online archive

Antibody Therapeutics is a quarterly peer-reviewed open-access medical journal focused on the development and application of antibody-based therapies. It was established in 2018 and is published by Oxford University Press on behalf of the Chinese Antibody Society (ChAbS). The editor-in-chief is Mitchell Ho (National Institutes of Health).

== History ==
The journal was launched in 2018 through a partnership between Oxford University Press and ChAbS. It was established as an open-access publication to provide a platform for the latest advances in therapeutic antibody research.

== Scope ==
The journal covers all aspects of therapeutic antibody research, including target and antibody discovery, therapeutic antibody engineering and development, mechanistic research, new technologies and methods, manufacturing, clinical trials, and regulatory policies. It publishes original research articles, reviews and methodological papers.

== Abstracting and indexing ==
The journal is abstracted and indexed in:

- Biological Abstracts
- BIOSIS Previews
- Directory of Open Access Journals (DOAJ)
- Emerging Sources Citation Index
- Scopus

According to the Journal Citation Reports, the journal has a 2025 impact factor of 4.8.
