= Serbian Citation Index =

SCIndeks - Serbian Citation Index
- Producer: Centre for Evaluation in Education and Science (Serbia)
- Languages: Serbian, English

Access
- Cost: Free

Coverage
- Disciplines: Science, social science, arts, humanities
- Record depth: Citation indexing, author, topic title, subject keywords, abstract, periodical title, author's address, publication year, full text
- Format coverage: Academic journal articles
- Temporal coverage: 1991 to present
- Geospatial coverage: Serbia
- No. of records: 80,000 + indexed articles and more than one million references

Links
- Website: scindeks.ceon.rs
- Title list(s): scindeks.ceon.rs/Journals.aspx

Serbian Citation Index (Serbian: Srpski citatni indeks; SCIndeks) is a combination of an online multidisciplinary bibliographic database, a national citation index, an Open Access full-text journal repository and an electronic publishing platform. It is produced and maintained by the Centre for Evaluation in Education and Science (CEON/CEES), based in Belgrade, Serbia. In July 2017, it indexed 230 Serbian scholarly journals in all areas of science and contained more than 80,000 bibliographic records and more than one million bibliographic references.

SCIndeks operates as a DOI registration agency and an OAI-PMH data provider. It is also an OpenAIRE data provider. Serbian Citation Index is a member of the Committee on Publication Ethics (COPE).

== Features ==
While the content of SCIndeks is freely available to users, the publishers of the indexed journals subscribe to one of four service packages that provide various levels of content indexing and quality control: from basic bibliographic data (no full text) to full-text availability, DOI assignment, bibliometric evaluation, journal management support and plagiarism detection.

The core of SCIndeks is a searchable bibliographic database that also contains citation information. It relies on a full text repository (SCIndeks Repository). The repository and journal profiles are maintained through the Editor Service, a back-end platform for journal editors. Publishers may also subscribe to SCIndeks Assistant, a journal management system based on Open Journal Systems and enriched with a number of in-house developed services, tools and protocols that enable the normalization of names, affiliations and funding information; automated parsing and formatting of references; matching of references and citations; keywords assignment, etc. SCIndeks Assistant also enables plagiarism detection through CrossRef Similarity Check, using iThenticate.

Bibliometric data contained in SCindeks are used to generate cumulative annual reports on the performance of the indexed journals – Journal Bibliometric Report, which tracks more than 20 quantitative and qualitative indicators.

SCindeks offers a number of functionalities to registered users, e.g. customized search and saved search alerts.

== Background and history ==
The development of SCIndeks was preceded by two projects: SocioFakt Online (a citation database for social sciences, established in 2001) and SocioFakt Open Access (a fully searchable and harvestable full-text journal repository, established in 2004). Both databases were developed by the CEON/CEES. SCIndeks draws on both projects but it covers all areas of science.

From the outset, SCIndeks was used as the source of information for the evaluation of locally published journals, i.e. the Journal Bibliometric Report, a local counterpart of the Journal Citation Reports.

SCIndeks was originally funded by the Ministry of Science of the Republic of Serbia, which means that indexing and bibliometric analyses were free for journals. Under this model, nearly 500 journals were covered and nearly 40% of papers were available as full text. In 2015, the Ministry of Education, Science and Technological Development ceased supporting SCIndeks. Consequently, SCIndeks changed the business model: it was no longer available free of charge to journal publishers interested in indexing and evaluation of their journals, while remaining freely available to readers.

In 2016-2017, SCIndeks was upgraded to enable ORCID integration and normalization of funder information. It was also made compatible with OpenAIRE.

Policy and Licensing Support Service was introduced in the Editor Service. It enables journals to define their editorial policies relying on a standardized template, which fully conforms to the requirements set by the Directory of Open Access Journals (DOAJ) in 2014.

== Gallery ==
SCIndeks Home page

Journal profile in SCIndeks

Article display in SCIndeks

== See also ==
- Bibliographic database
- List of academic databases and search engines
- Citation index
- Web of Science
- Scopus
- Google Scholar
- Journal Citation Reports
- DOAJ
- SciELO
- Russian Science Citation Index
- Indian Citation Index
- Chinese Science Citation Database
- Korea Citation Index
