= Live Search Books =

Microsoft books website, 2006–2008

- Live Search Books Publisher Program logo.

- Screenshot of Live Search Books
- Developer(s): Microsoft
- Preview release: Beta / December 6, 2006
- Type: Search Engine
- Website: livesearch.it.msn.com

Live Search Books Publisher Program

Live Search Books was a search service for books launched in December 2006, part of Microsoft's Live Search range of services. Microsoft was working with a number of libraries, including the British Library, to digitize books and make them searchable, and in the case of out-of-copyright books, available across the web.

Microsoft was running a Live Search Books Publisher Program (previously referred to as Windows Live Publisher) to encourage book publishers to send their books to be scanned and indexed for the service.

In May 2008, Microsoft closed their Live Search Books and Live Search Academic services, those results integrated into regular Search and/or returned to their owners. The project had scanned 750,000 books and indexed 80 million journal articles. The books scanned during the project are still available through Internet Archive, the organization that was hired by Microsoft to scan the books. Some scanning was also performed by Kirtas Technologies.

== Features ==
Live Search Books displayed in-copyright book contents from the following sources:

- Publishing partners including the [American Museum of Veterinary History ], Academic Resources Corporation, Amherst Media, Bearport Publishing, Cambridge University Press, Edward Elgar Publishing, Harrison House Publishers, Harvard University Press, Hazelden Publishing & Educational Services, Institute for International Economics, John Wiley & Sons Publishing, Lerner Publishing Group, MBI Publishing Company, McGraw-Hill Companies, Microsoft Corporation, MIT Press, OECD, Osprey Publishing, Oxford University Press, Pearson Education, PREP Publishing, Rodale, Rutgers University Press, Simon & Schuster, Springer, SUNY Press, Taylor & Francis Group, The Perseus Books Group, The World Bank, University of Massachusetts Press, Wheatmark, Wilderness Press, World Health Organization, World Scientific Publishing Company, World Wisdom, and Yale University Press
- Contents uploaded using Live Search Books Publisher Program

In addition to the normal search capabilities, Live Search Books also featured:

- Filter by the percentage of viewable contents
- Hit density map allowing users to see where the search results fall in a given title
- Preview window on the right displaying the title, author, cover image, summary, table of contents previews, hit density map, subject, publisher, published year, and ISBN
- Limited page previews with page preview counter restricting users to sign into their Windows Live ID to view only the number of pages limited by the publisher
- Search keywords within the book
- Download the entire book in PDF format
- Book viewer allowing users to view full pages or zoomed in, flip through the book page by page, and link to the book's table of contents

== See also ==
- Google Books
- Windows Live
- Live Search
