= OpenAlex =

Open catalog of scholarly papers, authors, institutions, venues, and concepts

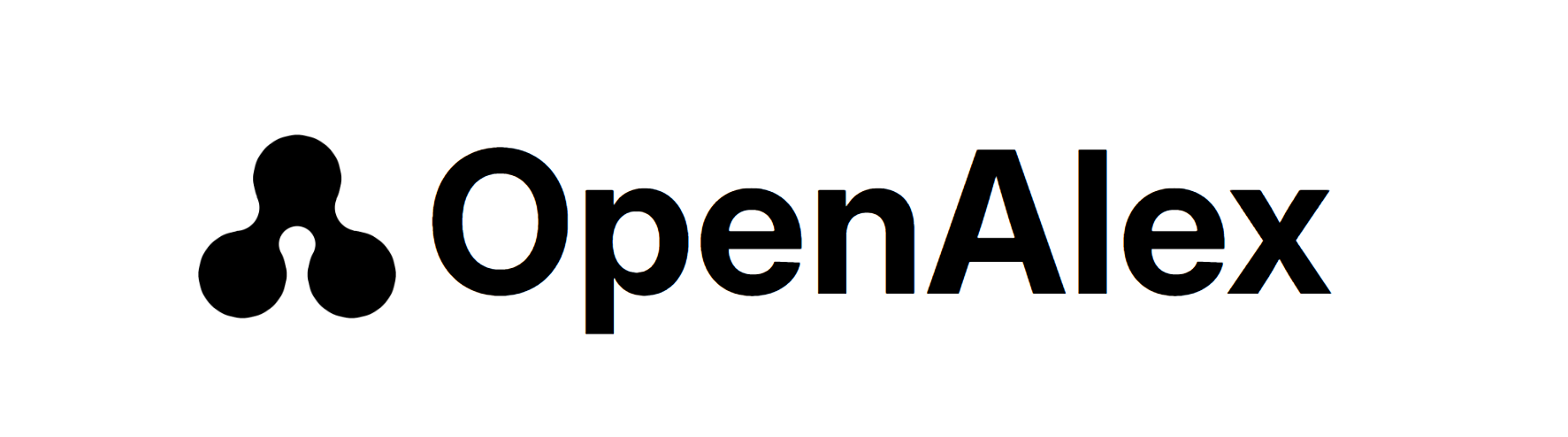
- OpenAlex logo since 2025
- Producer: OurResearch
- History: 2022; 4 years ago

Coverage
- Disciplines: Science, social science, arts, humanities (supports 256 disciplines)
- Record depth: Citation indexing, author, topic title, subject keywords, abstract, periodical title, author's address, publication year
- Format coverage: Articles, reviews, editorials, chronologies, abstracts, proceedings (journals and book-based), technical papers

Links
- Website: openalex.org

OpenAlex is a bibliographic catalogue of scientific papers, authors and institutions accessible in open access mode, named after the Library of Alexandria. It started operating in January 2022 by OurResearch as a successor of the terminated Microsoft Academic Graph. OpenAlex competes with commercial products such as Clarivate's Web of Science or Elsevier's Scopus, and is complemented by bibliometrics tools and an API. OpenAlex is challenging Web of Science and Scopus as a free, open-source research index, which covers over 200 million scholarly works.

== History ==
On 31 December 2021, the Microsoft Academic Graph (MAG) database stopped being updated. The non-profit organization OurResearch proposed the creation of an open access bibliographic database, named OpenAlex, with the ambition of providing a fully open catalogue for the global research system. OpenAlex was released in January 2022, including information from MAG as well as a free API. Its name is inspired by the Library of Alexandria, which created the first bibliographic catalogue in human history.

In September 2023, Leiden University in the Netherlands announced that it would now use OpenAlex to establish its research institution ranking for 2024. In December 2023, the Sorbonne University announced that it was deregistering from Scopus in favor of OpenAlex.

In 2024, the French Ministry of Research and Higher Education pledged to contribute financially to the project, considering it "as a crucial open science infrastructure".

By March 2024, OpenAlex included metadata for 209 million works such as journal articles and books; 13 million authors with ambiguous identities; metadata for 124,000 sites hosting works, including journals and online repositories; metadata for 109,000 institutions; and 65,000 Wikidata concepts, which are algorithmically linked to works using an automated multi-tag hierarchical classifier. In March of the same year, it announced that they had received a $7.5 million grant from the philanthropic initiative Arcadia, with the goal of making OpenAlex a real, open alternative to commercial solutions.

In June 2024 a paper got wider audience when a team of researchers found fabricated metadata entered into the Crossref database, which is also sourced by OpenAlex. Metadata in the reported examples does not contain the real citations any more, but made up citations.

== Uses ==
OpenAlex is used by universities to measure the progress of their research teams in terms of publishing publications or meeting sustainable development goals. OpenAlex relies on DOAJ data as well as Unpaywall data to indicate the status (closed or open) and route used for open access (open access in gold, green, bronze or hybrid versions), and in Aurora's requests to qualify the works indexed according to the sustainable development goals defined by the United Nations. It also uses information from Crossref and ORCID. In 2024 the API had a usage volume of 115 million monthly queries.

A 2024 study shows that OpenAlex is particularly good at indexing Diamond open access journals, with more than 12,500 indexed titles, including more than 60% of all Diamond OA journals not found in WoS or Scopus.

=== SemOpenAlex ===
SemOpenAlex is an RDF knowledge graph derived from OpenAlex. It was introduced at the International Semantic Web Conference in 2023 and represents OpenAlex metadata as more than 26 billion RDF triples about scholarly works and related entities, including authors, institutions, journals and concepts.

The dataset is released under the CC0 licence and is made available through RDF dump files, a SPARQL endpoint, dereferenceable URIs and links to other datasets in the Linked Open Data cloud. It has been described as enabling semantic search, scholarly impact analysis, bibliographic data analysis, recommender systems and benchmarks for RDF query processing and knowledge-graph-based language models.
