= The Lens =

Online patent and academic database

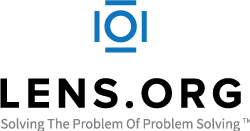
- Website type: Patent Search Service
- Available in: Multilingual
- Owner: SPIE
- Website: The Lens
- Commercial: Not for profit
- Registration: No
- Launched: 2001
- Current status: Active

The Lens (formerly Patent Lens) is a free, searchable online database of patents, scholarly literature, and patent-disclosed biological sequences. It is previously provided by Cambia, a non-profit organisation based in Australia. Since mid 2026, the platform has been operated by another Australian non-profit The Lens Limited, a wholly-owned subsidiary of SPIE, the international society for optics and photonics.

The Lens functions as an aggregation platform, drawing bibliometric data from various sources such as Crossref, PubMed, Microsoft Academic, and OpenAlex, and integrating them using advanced analytics to provide enriched, contextual information.

== History ==
The service was initially launched in 2001 as a database of U.S. patents focused on agricultural technologies. Between 2004 and 2007, under the leadership of Dr. Marie Connett and Dr. Richard Jefferson at Cambia, the platform expanded to include patents across all scientific disciplines, engineering fields, and other areas of innovation. This expansion also introduced access to patent applications and granted patents from multiple jurisdictions through a website then known as the Patent Lens. During this period, new tools were developed to enable searching of biological sequences within patent literature, alongside the introduction of dynamically updating patent landscapes tailored to specific fields. These enhancements supported the broader goal of democratising access to intellectual property data. Over time, the database has enabled free and open access to patent literature and facilitated the production of scholarly materials such as conference papers, reports, and books. The platform’s analytical tools have been continuously refined to uncover trends in patent ownership, citation patterns, and technology landscapes. In 2013, the platform was rebranded as The Lens. It has received funding support from several organisations over the years, including the Rockefeller Foundation (2000–2004), a donation via the International Rice Research Institute (2005–2006), the Bill & Melinda Gates Foundation (2011), the Gordon and Betty Moore Foundation (2012), the Wellcome Trust (2018), and the Lemelson Foundation.

On June 1, 2026, Cambia sold The Lens business and assets to The Lens Limited, a newly established Australian non-profit and a wholly owned subsidiary of SPIE. SPIE announced the acquisition on July 7, 2026. Financial terms were not disclosed. As of November 2026, The Lens hosts over 336.2 million scholarly works, more than 174.6 million global patent records, and upwards of 664.4 million biological sequences.

== Features ==
The Patent Lens Sequence Project, launched in June 2006, is the only publicly accessible resource that allows users to explore more than 80 million DNA and protein sequences disclosed in patents.

Patent tutorials are available on the site covering patent claims, freedom to operate, patent inventorship, and continuing patent applications. Plant breeders' rights (PBR), also known as plant variety rights (PVR), are also addressed. This has the intention to "forge a learning resource that participants in innovation systems at all levels... can use to learn of critical and timely issues relevant to improving the public good... by engaging with the patent system".

The patent search interface is available in Chinese, English and French, with the full text of European Patent Office (EPO) patents being searchable in English, French and German. PCT applications are searchable in Chinese, English, French, German, Japanese, Korean, Russian and Spanish.

Only a limited number of studies looked into the comparison of the number of publications indexed in the academic research databases. A 2025 study from a medical university in China limited to scleral contact lenses concluded, that Scopus had 3.6% more references than Web of Science. In a 2024 publication from the University of Jordan the publications from their university referenced in several databases were compared. The authors found, that the degree of coverage decreases in the order: Scopus~Web of Science>The Lens.

A 2024 study from Spain concluded that zero-cost The Lens, which combined the data from Crossref, PubMed, Core and OpenAlex, had the largest coverage, with more than 247 million bibliographic records. No-cost Open Alex had the second largest coverage of about 240 million publications in total. Free SciLit came in third with 149 million of publications agglomerated from Crossref, PubMed, preprint repositories and publishers. Web of Science Core Collection came in fourth with 85 mln. records. Scopus was the fifth with 78 million records. While no database was comprehensive, the coverage overlap between any two databases was substantial.

== Response ==
Francis Gurry, director general of the World Intellectual Property Organization (WIPO) in March 2009, stated that the landscaping activities of the Patent Lens: in "view of the shared objective of making patent information systems more comprehensive and accessible, and turning raw patent data into useful information resources so as to strengthen the empirical basis of international policy processes".

Nature Biotechnology called the Patent Lens "a giant leap in the right direction" for providing researchers, technology transfer offices and company executives a facile means of establishing the novelty of their offerings and the nature of their competitors' inventions.

== See also ==
- Biological Innovation for Open Society
- Richard Anthony Jefferson
- Digital Science
