= Microsoft Academic =

Online bibliographic database

- Website type: Bibliographic database
- Owner: Microsoft
- Website: academic.microsoft.com
- Registration: Optional
- Launched: February 22, 2016; 10 years ago
- Current status: Inactive (No longer accessible after Dec. 31, 2021)

Microsoft Academic was a free internet-based academic search engine for academic publications and literature, developed by Microsoft Research in 2016 as a successor of Microsoft Academic Search. Microsoft Academic was shut down at the end of 2021. Both OpenAlex and The Lens claim to be successors to Microsoft Academic.

== History ==
Microsoft Academic gained prominence because it profiled authors, organizations, keywords, and journals and made the dataset available as open data, in contrast to Google Scholar. The search engine indexed over 260 million publications, 88 million of which are journal articles.

Preliminary reviews by bibliometricians suggested the new Microsoft Academic Search was a competitor to Google Scholar, Web of Science, and Scopus for academic research purposes as well as citation analysis. However, it was primarily used as a resource in the field of computer science since that was the most completely indexed information.

On May 4, 2021, Microsoft announced that the Microsoft Academic website and APIs would be retired on December 31, 2021.

Thanks to the open data license, the Microsoft Academic dataset was merged into OpenAlex. However, the underlying software was proprietary and had to be rewritten.

That Microsoft launched and soon-after shut down both Microsoft Academic and its predecessor Microsoft Academic Search has been interpreted as a sign that Microsoft "had never intended to enter into the business of scholarly metadata. Instead, the tech giant has been using data on scholarly communication as testing ground for big data and artificial intelligence (AI) technologies".

== Technology ==
The Academic Knowledge API offered information retrieval from the underlying database using REST endpoints for advanced research purposes. The search engine provided not only search results and access to sources but also citation information that include the number of sources, g-index, and h-index. Aside from academic publications, it was also used to find websites that contain state and local records. The technology uses machine learning, semantic inference and knowledge discovery from sources crawled and indexed by the Bing search engine.

Microsoft Academic replaced the earlier Microsoft research project, Microsoft Academic Search, which ended development in 2012. The platform was developed in 2009 of the Microsoft Research branch in Asia and the project was headed by Zaiqing Nie. Microsoft Academic was re-launched in 2016, as a tool that features an entirely new data structure and search engine using semantic search technologies.

== See also ==
- List of academic databases and search engines
- Live Search Academic (2006 – 2008)
- Microsoft Academic Search (predecessor, shut down 2012)
- OpenAlex
