= BitFunnel =

Search engine indexing algorithm for Bing

- Developer: Microsoft
- Initial release: 2016; 9 years ago
- Repository: github.com/BitFunnel
- Written in: C++
- Platform: Windows, macOS, Ubuntu
- Type: Search engine indexing algorithm
- License: MIT License
- Website: bitfunnel.org

BitFunnel is the search engine indexing algorithm and a set of components used in the Bing search engine, which were made open source in 2016. BitFunnel uses bit-sliced signatures instead of an inverted index in an attempt to reduce operations cost.

== History ==
Progress on the implementation of BitFunnel was made public in early 2016, with the expectation that there would be a usable implementation later that year. In September 2016, the source code was made available via GitHub. A paper discussing the BitFunnel algorithm and implementation was released as through the Special Interest Group on Information Retrieval of the Association for Computing Machinery in 2017 and won the Best Paper Award.

== Components ==
BitFunnel consists of three major components:

- BitFunnel – the text search/retrieval system itself
- WorkBench – a tool for preparing text for use in BitFunnel
- NativeJIT – a software component that takes expressions that use C data structures and transforms them into highly optimized assembly code

== Algorithm ==
=== Initial problem and solution overview ===
The BitFunnel paper describes the "matching problem", which occurs when an algorithm must identify documents through the usage of keywords. The goal of the problem is to identify a set of matches given a corpus to search and a query of keyword terms to match against. This problem is commonly solved through inverted indexes, where each searchable item is maintained with a map of keywords.

In contrast, BitFunnel represents each searchable item through a signature. A signature is a sequence of bits which describe a Bloom filter of the searchable terms in a given searchable item. The bloom filter is constructed through hashing through several bit positions.

=== Theoretical implementation of bit-string signatures ===
The signature of a document (D) can be described as the logical-or of its term signatures:

$$\overrightarrow{S_D}=\bigcup_{t \in D} \overrightarrow{S_t}$$

Similarly, a query for a document (Q) can be defined as a union:

$$\overrightarrow{S_Q}=\bigcup_{t \in Q} \overrightarrow{S_t}$$

Additionally, a document D is a member of the set M' when the following condition is satisfied:

$$\overrightarrow{S_Q} \cap \overrightarrow{S_D} = \overrightarrow{S_Q}$$

This knowledge is then combined to produce a formula where M' is identified by documents which match the query signature:

$$M'= \left\{ D \in C \mid \overrightarrow{S_Q} \cap \overrightarrow{S_D} = \overrightarrow{S_Q}\right\}$$

These steps and their proofs are discussed in the 2017 paper.

=== Pseudocode for bit-string signatures ===
This algorithm is described in the 2017 paper.
$$\begin{array}{l}
M'=\emptyset \\
\texttt{for each}\ D \in C\ \texttt{do} \\
\qquad \texttt{if}\ \overrightarrow{S_D} \cap \overrightarrow{S_Q} = \overrightarrow{S_Q}\ \texttt{then} \\
\qquad \qquad M' = M' \cup \{ D \} \\
\qquad \texttt{end if} \\
\texttt{end for}
\end{array}$$
