= Acknowledgment index =

Index for analyzing acknowledgements and recognitions in scientific literature

An acknowledgment index (British acknowledgement index) is a scientometric index which analyzes acknowledgments in scientific literature and attempts to quantify their impact. Typically, a scholarly article has a section in which the authors acknowledge entities such as funding, technical staff, colleagues, etc. that have contributed materials or knowledge or have influenced or inspired their work. Like an index based on citation impact, an acknowledgment index measures influences on scientific work, but in a different sense; it measures institutional and economic influences as well as informal influences of individual people, ideas, and artifacts. Unlike the impact factor, it does not produce a single overall metric, but analyzes the components separately. However, the total number of acknowledgments to an acknowledged entity can be measured and so can the number of citations to the papers in which the acknowledgment appears. The ratio of this total number of citations to the total number of papers in which the acknowledge entity appears can be construed as the impact of that acknowledged entity.

The first automated acknowledgment indexing was created in the search engine and digital library, CiteSeer. However, that feature is no longer supported. Another acknowledgment extraction and indexing system for acknowledgment was AckSeer, however, that indexing system is not available today as well.

== See also ==
- Citation impact
- CiteSeerX
- Metascience
- Citation index
