= Genetic use restriction technology =

Methods for controlling the use of GMOs

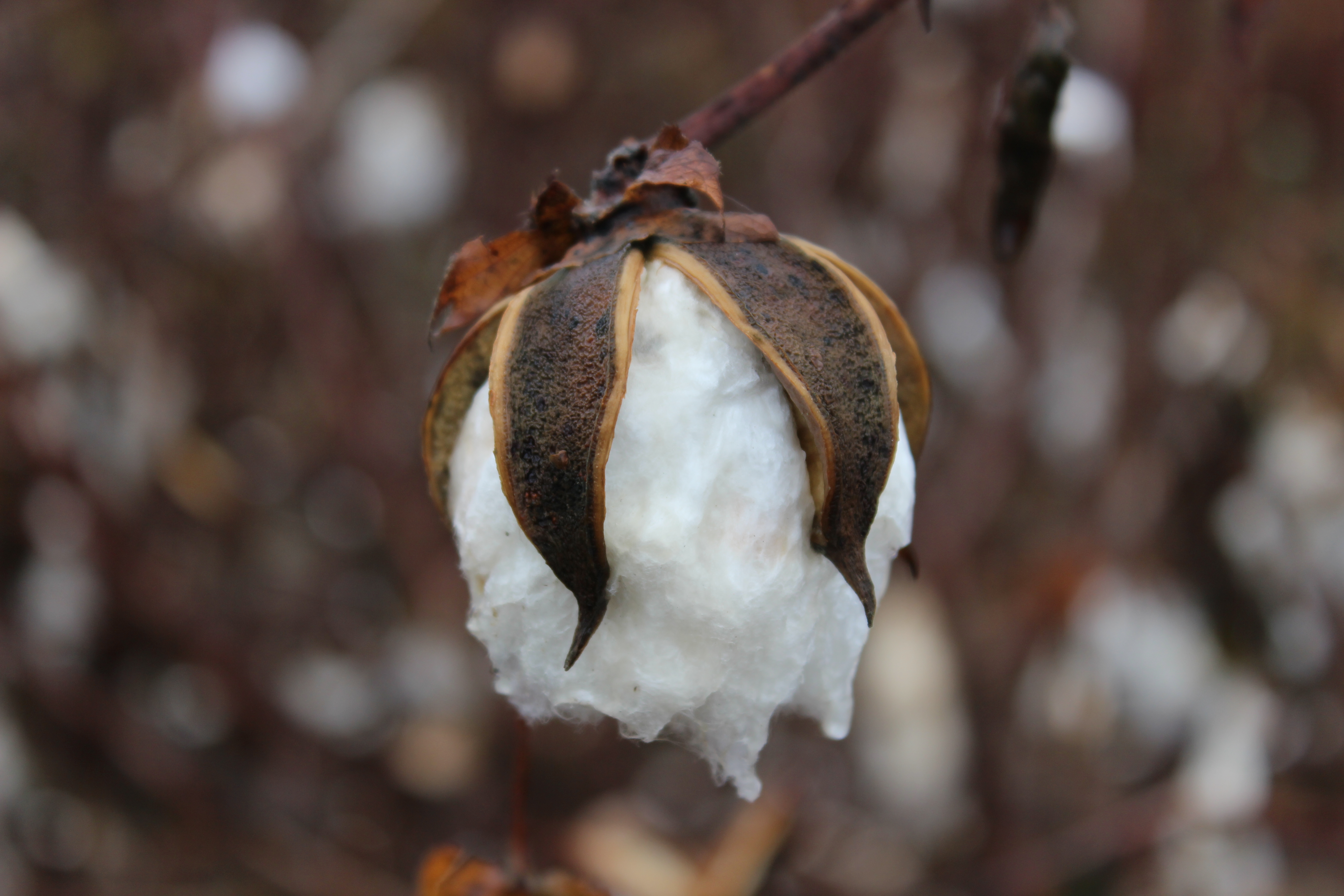
Plants such as an infertile cotton strain have been made in laboratories using GURT.

Genetic use restriction technology (GURT), also known as terminator technology or suicide seeds, is designed to restrict access to "genetic materials and their associated phenotypic traits." The technology works by activating (or deactivating) specific genes using a controlled stimulus in order to cause second generation seeds to be either infertile or to not have one or more of the desired traits of the first generation plant. GURTs can be used by agricultural firms to enhance protection of their innovations in genetically modified organisms by making it impossible for farmers to reproduce the desired traits on their own. Another possible use is to prevent the escape of genes from genetically modified organisms into the surrounding environment.

Patent applications related to a biological switch mechanism emerged in the early 1990's by companies such as DuPont and Zeneca (today Syngenta). Though the original GURT technology named "Technology Protection System" or "TPS" was developed under a cooperative research and development agreement between the Agricultural Research Service of the United States Department of Agriculture and Delta & Pine Land Company in the 1990s. The purpose of the development was to protect the intellectual property of biotechnology firms that the United States Department of Agriculture viewed as being a specifically American technological competence. The United States Patent and Trademark Office (USPTO) granted the application and issued a patent on March 3rd, 1998, the exclusive rights of the license given to the Delta & Pine Land Company through a research agreement. Monsanto bought Delta & Pine Land Co. acquiring its patents in 2007, although the original patent has since expired. The technology, while still being developed, is not yet commercially available due to the political and scientific controversies that accompanied its development.

GURT was first reported on by the Subsidiary Body on Scientific, Technical and Technological Advice (SBSTTA) to the UN Convention on Biological Diversity and discussed during the 8th Conference of the Parties to the United Nations Convention on Biological Diversity in Curitiba, Brazil, March 20–31, 2006.

== Process ==
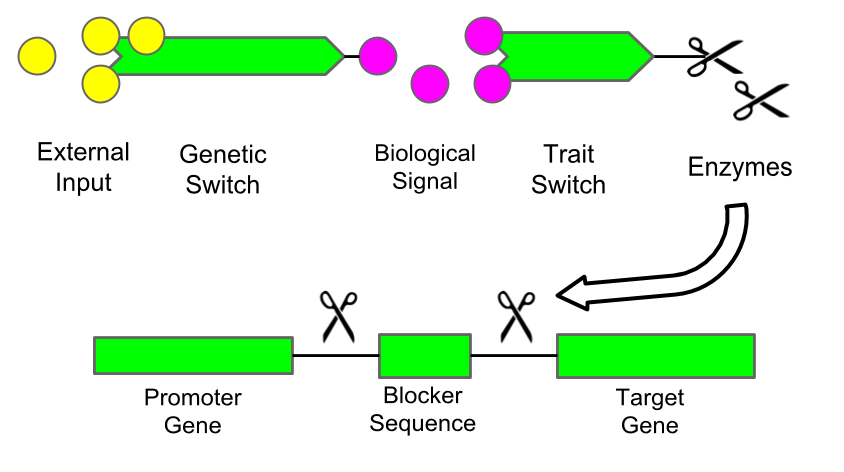
A GURT process that uses biological signals to make enzymes that cut out the blocker sequence.

The GURT process is typically composed of four genetic components: a target gene, a promoter, a trait switch, and a genetic switch, sometimes with slightly different names given in different papers. A typical GURT involves the engineering of a plant that has a target gene in its DNA that expresses when activated by a promoter gene. However, it is separated from the target gene by a blocker sequence that prevents the promoter from accessing the target. When the plant receives a given external input, a genetic switch in the plant takes the input, amplifies it, and converts it into a biological signal. When a trait switch receives the amplified signal, it creates an enzyme that cuts the blocker sequence out. With the blocker sequence eliminated, the promoter gene allows the target gene to express itself in the plant.

In other versions of the process, an operator must bind to the trait switch in order for it to make the enzymes that cut out the blocker sequence. However, there are repressors that bind to the trait switch and prevent it from doing so. In this case, when the external input is applied, the repressors bond to the input instead of to the trait switch, allowing the enzymes to be created that cut the blocker sequence, thereby allowing the trait to be expressed.

Other GURTs embody alternative approaches, such as letting the genetic switch directly affect the blocker sequence and bypass the need for a trait switch.

== Variants ==
There are two broad categories of GURTs: Variety-specific genetic use restriction technologies (V-GURTs) and Trait specific genetic use restriction technologies (T-GURTs). The two variants have been described as follows:

V-GURTs are designed to restrict the use of all genetic materials contained in an entire plant variety. Prior to being sold to growers, the seeds of V-GURTs are activated by the seed company. The seeds can germinate, and the plants grow and reproduce normally, but their offspring will be sterile... . Thus, farmers could not save seed from year-to-year to replant. In contrast, T-GURTs only restrict the use of particular traits conferred by a transgene, but seeds are fertile. Growers could replant seed from the previous harvest, but they would not contain the transgenic trait.

=== Variety specific GURTs or V-GURTs ===
Variety-specific genetic use restriction technologies destroy seed development and plant fertility by means of a "genetic process triggered by a chemical inducer that will allow the plant to grow and to form seeds, but will cause the embryo of each of those seeds to produce a cell toxin that will prevent its germination if replanted, thus causing second generation seeds to be sterile... ." The toxin degrades the DNA or RNA of the plant. Thus, the seed from the crop is not viable and cannot be used as seeds to produce subsequent crops, but only for sale as food or fodder.

=== Trait specific GURTs or T-GURTs ===
Trait specific genetic use restriction technologies modify a crop in such a way that the genetic enhancement engineered into the crop does not function until the plant is treated with a specific chemical. The chemical acts as the external input, activating the target gene. One difference in T-GURTs is the possibility that the gene could be toggled on and off with different chemical inputs, resulting in the same toggling on or off an associated trait. With T-GURTs, seeds could possibly be saved for planting with a condition that the new plants do not get any enhanced traits unless the external input is added.

== Benefits and risks ==
GURTs have a number of potential uses, though they have not yet been used in commercial agricultural products available on the market or in pharmaceutical applications. These uses include protection of intellectual property for biotechnological innovations, and bio-confinement (preventing escape of genetically engineered genes into nature).

=== Intellectual property protection ===
The original aim of the developers of GURTs was the protection of intellectual property in agricultural biotechnology. That is, the developers sought to prevent farmers from reusing patented seeds in cases where patents for biological innovations did not exist or could not be easily enforced. This problem is not generally posed for farmers using hybrid seeds (which, in any case, are not fertile or do not breed true) and, thus, could not be used to grow subsequent crops. However, the V-GURTS make it impossible for farmers to use seeds they have produced to grow crops in subsequent seasons because the entire genome of the targeted cells is destroyed. The T-GURTs could be used by seed companies to allow for the commercialization of seeds that are fertile, but that develop into plants with desired traits only when sprayed with an activator chemical sold by the company. Corporate seed companies are strongly in favor of GURTs since they can be used as a policing method for Intellectual Property which has brought large opposition from developing nations. These nations fear even more power will be given to these corporations which would no longer have to bring a suit proving infringement but instead the farmer could be presumed guilty and cutoff from their supply immediately.

=== Bio-confinement ===
An ongoing fear raised by GURTs and other biotechnologies is that the genes of genetically modified plants might escape into nature via sexual reproduction with compatible wild plants or with other cultivated plants. This is known as 'transgene escape' and is among the highest priority risks posed by genetic engineering of plants. This risk of escape is one of the reasons that the GURT process has not yet been used in commercial applications (indeed, the main producing companies have vowed to not commercialize these products, though they still have related research programs such as Monsanto which spends 40% of its research budget on developing GM seeds). Ironically, GURTs – themselves a process for the genetic modification of plants – may also be used to secure the 'bio-confinement' of the transgenes of genetically modified plants. GURTs, because they control plant fertility in various ways, could be used to prevent the escape of transgenes into wild relatives and help reduce risks of deleterious impacts on biodiversity. For bio-confinement, both "V- and T GURTs could be targeted to reproductive tissues, most typically pollen and seed (or embryo)." Crops modified to produce non-food products (eg. in pharmacology, therapeutic proteins, monoclonal antibodies and vaccines) could be armed with GURTs to prevent accidental transmission of these traits into crops meant for foods. Even then problems could arise, since GURTs require a signal some of these seeds will inevitably not receive the signal passing on the termination step through hybridization to the native gene pool. Since the outright confinement of GM genetic material is likely impossible the terminator trait could attach randomly and possibly decrease the ability of natural species to produce.

=== Other uses ===
Another possible advantage is that non-viable seeds produced on V-GURT plants may reduce the propagation of volunteer plants. Volunteer plants can become an economic problem for larger-scale mechanized farming systems that incorporate crop rotation. Furthermore, under warm, wet harvest conditions non V-GURT grain can sprout, lowering the quality of grain produced. It is likely that this problem would not occur with the use of V-GURT grain varieties.

Another proposed use is in synthetic biology, where a restricted activator chemical must be added to the fermentation medium to produce a desired output chemical.

There is also the possibility of using GURT seed technology against invasive plant species where the genetically modified plant would fertilize invasive species creating ''terminator seeds''. These seeds would be sterile, possibly stopping the invasive from being as successful especially after fires, droughts, or other disturbances when ecosystems are more prone. This could help lower pressure during restoration projects, and protect native ecosystems.

== Controversy ==
As of 2025, GURT seeds have not been commercialized anywhere in the world due to opposition from farmers, consumers, indigenous peoples, NGOs, and some governments. Using the technology, companies that manufacture genetic use restriction technologies could potentially acquire an advantageous position vis-a-vis farmers because the seeds sold could not be resown. V-GURTs would not have an immediate impact on the many farmers who use hybrid seeds, as they do not produce their own planting seeds, buying instead specialized hybrid seeds from seed production companies. However, in developing countries globally, 80 to 90 percent of the seeds farmers use have been saved from their past harvests. Another concern is that farmers purchasing the seeds would be greatly impacted, given they would have to buy new seeds every year. It has been argued that this would result in higher prices in food.

Some analysts have expressed concerns that GURT seeds might adversely impact biodiversity and threaten native species of plants. However, proponents of the technology dispute these claims, arguing that because non-GMO hybrid plants are used in the same way and GURT seeds could help farmers deal with cross pollination, the benefits outweigh the potential negatives.

In 2000, the United Nations Convention on Biological Diversity recommended a de facto moratorium on field-testing and commercial sale of terminator seeds; the moratorium was re-affirmed and the language strengthened in March 2006, at the COP8 meeting of the UNCBD. Specifically, the moratorium recommended that, due to a lack of research on the technology's potential risks, no field testing of GURTs nor products using them should be allowed until there was a sufficiently justified reason to do so. Multiple countries have passed legislation prohibiting the technology including India's Protection of Plant Varieties and Farmers' Rights Act, 2001 and Brazil's Biosecurity Law No.11.105.

== See also ==
- Cartagena Protocol on Biosafety
- Diamond v. Chakrabarty
- Digital rights management
- Genetic pollution
- Genetically modified organism
- Seed saving
- Transgenic maize
