= Live Search Academic =

Former web search engine for scholarly literature

- Screenshot of Live Search Academic
- Developer(s): Microsoft
- Preview release: Beta / April 11, 2006
- Type: Search engine
- Website: http://academic.live.com

Live Search Academic was a Web search engine for scholarly literature that existed from April 2006 to May 2008; it was part of Microsoft's Live Search group of services. It was similar to Google Scholar, but rather than crawling the Internet for academic content, search results came directly from trusted sources, such as publishers of academic journals. Users were required to log in to access the service.

Live Search Academic was known as Windows Live Academic Search when the beta version was officially launched on April 11, 2006. The name had changed to Live Search Academic by December 6, 2006, when Microsoft announced the addition of millions of new articles, mainly in biomedicine.

On May 23, 2008, Microsoft announced the end of Live Search Academic and Live Search Books, both sites to be closed, with their results integrated into regular Search. The project scanned 750,000 books and indexed 80 million journal articles.

== Features ==
Live Search Academic indexed journal articles, conference proceedings, books, theses and dissertations from the following fields:

- Information and computer science
- Physics
- Electrical engineering
- Biomedicine

In addition to the normal search capabilities, Live Search Academic also featured:

- Sorting by relevance, date, author, journal and conference
- Slider bar to change level of details of search results
- Export citations for different formats, including BibTeX, RefWorks and EndNote
- Preview window on the right displaying the title, journal name, abstract summary, authors, volume, publication year, publisher, source and the article's digital object identifier

== See also ==
- Web of Science from the Institute for Scientific Information
- Live Search
- Microsoft Academic Search
- Scirus
- Scopus
- Windows Live
