= Korea Citation Index =

South Korean citation index

- Producer: National Research Foundation of Korea (South Korea)
- History: 2007; 18 years ago
- Languages: Korean, English

Coverage
- Temporal coverage: 2004–present

Links
- Website: www.kci.go.kr

The Korea Citation Index (KCI, 한국학술지인용색인) is a non-commercial South Korean citation index operated by the National Research Foundation of Korea (NRF, 한국연구재단). Though it mainly covers researches written in Korean language, some of English language journals are also indexed in KCI. Established in 2007, KCI covers selected South Korean journals and their researches published from year 2004. KCI indexed journals are reported to respond faster than SCI and SSCI indexed journals.

KCI is directly linked to 'Korea Researcher Information' (한국연구자정보), an unified national database for each researcher's personal data in South Korea, since KCI was designed to more precisely evaluate research competency of each South Korean universities. Researches written in Korean language cannot be evaluated appropriately under English language oriented global indices (such as Impact factor).

From year 2020, the NRF classifies KCI related journals into four categories; Not Accredited (일반), Candidate (등재후보), Accredited (등재), and Excellent Accredited (우수등재). While promotion from 'Not Accredited' to 'Candidate Journal' and 'Accredited Journal' only requires quantitative standards to be met, promotion from 'Accredited Journal' to 'Excellent Accredited Journal' should pass several strict qualitative evaluation criteria. The Excellent Accredited Journals are selected among top 10% of normal Accredited Journals.

== See also ==
- Korea Research Foundation
- Science Citation Index
- Social Sciences Citation Index
- Arts and Humanities Citation Index
- Web of Science § Regional databases
