= The Global Journal =

Defunct political magazine in Switzerland (2010–2013)

- Editor: Jean-Christophe Nothias
- Categories: International affairs
- Frequency: Bimonthly
- Publisher: Société des Fondateurs de The Global Journal SA
- Founder: Jean-Christophe Nothias
- Founded: 2010
- First issue: June 2010
- Final issue: 15 March 2013
- Country: Switzerland
- Based in: Geneva
- Language: English
- Website: theglobaljournal.net

The Global Journal was a bimonthly online and printed magazine published by the Société des Fondateurs de The Global Journal SA concentrating on global governance issues. It was established in June 2010 by Jean-Christophe Nothias. Its newsroom was located in Geneva. The Global Journal had its largest audience in North America, Europe, and India. The magazine ceased its activity in March 2013 due to insolvency.

The magazine published interviews, essays, reviews, articles, and photographs and published a list of the Top 100 NGOs. It named the Wikimedia Foundation as the #1 NGO in the world in 2012 and subsequently published an article about Wikipedia and its founder, Jimmy Wales, in its February 2012 issue.

The magazine's "partner" organizations included: the Geneva Academy of International Humanitarian Law and Human Rights, the Fondation Pour Genève, Global Geneva, the Human Rights Foundation, Internations, Poster for Tomorrow, the University of Geneva, and YaleGlobal Online.
