= Material transfer agreement =

Research contract

A material transfer agreement (MTA) is a contract that governs the transfer of tangible research materials between two organizations when the recipient intends to use it for his or her own research purposes. The MTA defines the rights of the provider and the rights and obligations of the recipient with respect to the materials and any progeny, derivatives, or modifications.

The material can be of any kind, from chemicals, electronics, biological, or any other material. Biological materials, such as cell lines, plasmids, and vectors, are the most frequently transferred materials. But MTAs are also used for other types of materials, such as chemical compounds, reagents, mouse models, and even some types of software.

== MTA types ==
Three types of MTAs are most common at academic institutions: transfer between academic or research institutions, transfer from academia to industry and transfer from industry to academia. Each calls for different terms and conditions.

For simple transfers not involving intellectual property, in the US the National Institutes of Health (NIH) recommends a simple letter agreement. For materials that may be patented or for which more protection is desired, the NIH has developed a Uniform Biological Material Transfer Agreement (UBMTA). Many U.S. educational institutions have signed the UBMTA Master Agreement. AUTM (previously the Association of University Technology Managers) serves as the repository for the original UBMTA Master Agreement and maintains the list of the signatories. Signatories to the UBMTA Master Agreement only have to sign an implementing letter with the details of the particular transfer since they have already agreed to all the terms of the Master Agreement.

== Bibliography ==
- Rodriguez, Victor (2005). Material transfer agreements: open science vs. proprietary claims. Nature Biotechnology, Vol. 23, No. 4, pp. 489–491.
- Rodriguez, Victor (2007a). Material transfer agreements: Avoiding collisions with technology managers. BNA's Patent, Trademark and Copyright Journal, Vol. 73, No. 1802, pp. 305–308.
- Rodriguez, Victor (2007b). Merton and Ziman’s modes of science: The case of biological and similar material transfer agreements. Science and Public Policy, Vol. 34, No. 5, pp. 355–363.
- Rodriguez, Victor (2008). Governance of material transfer agreements. Technology in Society, Vol. 30, No. 2, pp. 122–128.
- Rodriguez, Victor and Koenraad Debackere (2007). Strategies for satisfying the need of research materials. Les Nouvelles, September, pp. 529–533.
- Rodriguez, Victor et al. (2007a). Do material transfer agreements affect the choice of research agendas? The case of biotechnology in Belgium. Scientometrics, Vol. 71, No. 2, pp. 239–269.
- Rodriguez, Victor et al. (2007b). Material transfer agreements and collaborative publication activity: The case of a biotechnology network. Research Evaluation, Vol. 16, No. 2, pp. 123–136.
- Rodriguez, Victor et al. (2008). On material transfer agreements and visibility of researchers in biotechnology. Journal of Informetrics, Vol. 2, No. 1, pp. 89–100.
