= Emerging Sources Citation Index =

Citation index produced since 2015

- Producer: Clarivate
- History: 2015; 11 years ago

Coverage
- Disciplines: Multidisciplinary
- Geospatial coverage: Worldwide

Links
- Website: clarivate.com/academia-government/scientific-and-academic-research/research-discovery-and-referencing/web-of-science/web-of-science-core-collection/emerging-sources-citation-index/

The Emerging Sources Citation Index (ESCI) is a citation index produced since 2015 by Thomson Reuters and now by Clarivate. According to the publisher, the index includes "peer-reviewed publications of regional importance and in emerging scientific fields".

The ESCI is accessible through the Web of Science, together with other Clarivate indexes. As of June 2021, all journals indexed in ESCI are also included in the Journal Citation Reports. While these journals still did not receive an impact factor until the next year, they did contribute citations to the calculation of other journals' impact factors. In July 2022, Clarivate announced that journals in the ESCI obtain an impact factor effective from JCR Year 2022 first released in June 2023.

== Inclusion criteria ==
To be included in the ESCI, journals must be:

- Peer reviewed
- Follow ethical publishing practices
- Meet technical requirements
- Have English language bibliographic information
- Be recommended or requested by a scholarly audience of Web of Science users

== Criticism ==
Jeffrey Beall argued that among the databases produced by Clarivate, the ESCI is the easiest one to get into and that (as a result) it contains many predatory journals.

== See also ==
- Science Citation Index Expanded (SCIE)
