= Microsoft Bing =

Web search engine developed by Microsoft

- Main logo and wordmark since October 2020

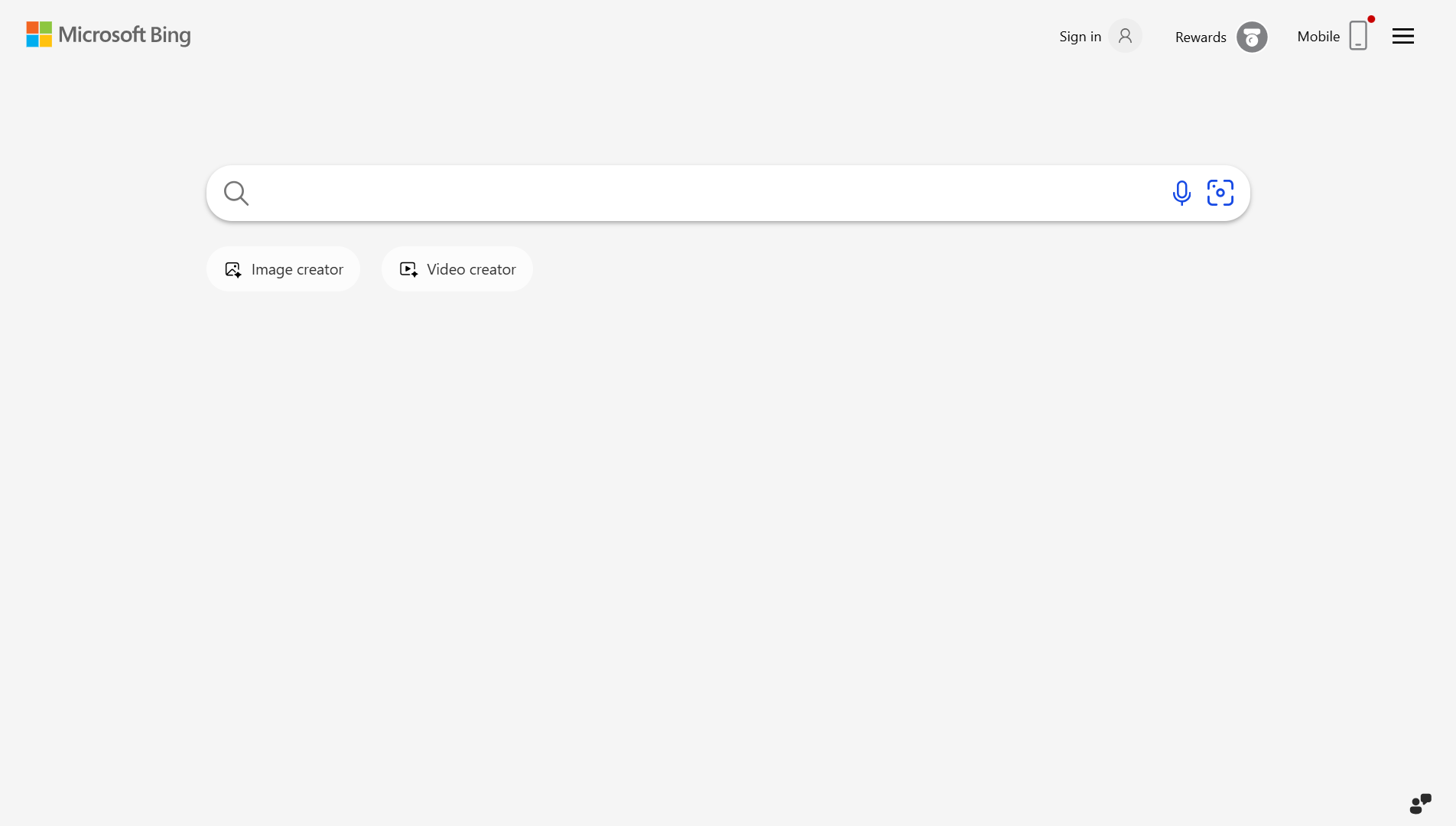
- Homepage as of November 16, 2026
- Website type: Search engine
- Available in: 40 languages
- Owner: Microsoft (through Microsoft AI)
- Creator: Microsoft
- Revenue: Microsoft Advertising
- Website: bing.com
- IPv6 support: Yes
- Commercial: Yes
- Registration: Optional (Microsoft account)
- Launched: June 3, 2009; 17 years ago
- Current status: Active
- Written in: ASP.NET

Microsoft Bing
- Developer: Microsoft
- Release: App launched July 2014; 12 years ago

Stable release(s) [±]
- Windows (Note: Bing for Windows Search in taskbar): 1.2.162 / November 12, 2025; 12 months ago
- Android: 33.5 (Build 44062300.6) / June 23, 2026; 4 months ago
- iOS (Note: Including iPadOS): 34.4 (Build 44110600.1) / November 11, 2026; 7 days ago
- Operating system: Windows 10, 11; Android 11+; iOS 18+
- Type: Search engine
- Website: www.bing.com

Microsoft Bing (also known simply as Bing) is a search engine owned and operated by Microsoft, and developed by Microsoft AI. The service traces its roots back to Microsoft's earlier search engines, including MSN Search, Windows Live Search, and Live Search. Bing offers a broad spectrum of search services, encompassing web, video, image, and map search products, all developed using ASP.NET.

The transition from Live Search to Bing was announced by Microsoft CEO Steve Ballmer on May 28, 2009, at the All Things Digital conference in San Diego, California. The official release followed on June 3, 2009. Bing introduced several notable features at its inception, such as search suggestions during query input and a list of related searches, known as the "Explore pane". These features leveraged semantic technology from Powerset, a company Microsoft acquired in 2008. Microsoft also struck a deal with Yahoo! that led to Bing powering Yahoo! Search.

Microsoft made significant strides towards open-source technology in 2016, making the BitFunnel search engine indexing algorithm and various components of Bing open source. In February 2023, Microsoft launched Bing Chat (later renamed Microsoft Copilot), an artificial intelligence chatbot experience based on GPT-4, integrated directly into the search engine. This was well-received, with Bing reaching 100 million active users by the following month.

As of April 2024, Bing holds the position of the second-largest search engine worldwide, with a market share of 3.64%, behind Google's 90.91%. Other competitors include Yandex with 1.61%, Baidu with 1.15%, and Yahoo!, which is largely powered by Bing, with 1.13%. Approximately 27.43% of Bing's monthly global traffic comes from China, 22.16% from the United States, 4.85% from Japan, 4.18% from Germany and 3.61% from France.

== History ==
=== Background (1998–2009) ===
==== MSN Search ====
MSN Search homepage in 2002

MSN Search homepage in 2006

Microsoft launched MSN Search in the third quarter of 1998, using search results from Inktomi. It consisted of a search engine, index, and web crawler. In early 1999, MSN Search launched a version which displayed listings from Looksmart blended with results from Inktomi except for a short time in 1999 when results from AltaVista were used instead. Microsoft decided to make a large investment in web search by building its own web crawler for MSN Search, the index of which was updated weekly and sometimes daily. The upgrade started as a beta program in November 2004, and came out of beta in February 2005. This occurred a year after rival Yahoo! Search rolled out its own crawler. Image search was powered by a third party, Picsearch. The service also started providing its search results to other search engine portals in an effort to better compete in the market.

==== Windows Live Search ====
Windows Live Search homepage

The first public beta of Windows Live Search was unveiled on March 8, 2006, with the final release on September 11, 2006 replacing MSN Search. The new search engine used search tabs that include Web, news, images, music, desktop, local, and Microsoft Encarta.

In the roll-over from MSN Search to Windows Live Search, Microsoft stopped using Picsearch as their image search provider and started performing their own image search, fueled by their own internal image search algorithms.

==== Live Search ====
Live Search homepage, which would help to create the Bing homepage later on

On March 21, 2007, Microsoft announced that it would separate its search developments from the Windows Live services family, rebranding the service as Live Search. Live Search was integrated into the Live Search and Ad Platform headed by Satya Nadella, part of Microsoft's Platform and Systems division. As part of this change, Live Search was merged with Microsoft adCenter.

A series of reorganizations and consolidations of Microsoft's search offerings were made under the Live Search branding. On May 23, 2008, Microsoft discontinued Live Search Books and Live Search Academic and integrated all academic and book search results into regular search. This also included the closure of the Live Search Books Publisher Program. Windows Live Expo was discontinued on July 31, 2008. Live Search Macros, a service for users to create their own custom search engines or use macros created by other users, was also discontinued. On May 15, 2009, Live Product Upload, a service which allowed merchants to upload products information onto Live Search Products, was discontinued. The final reorganization came as Live Search QnA was rebranded MSN QnA on February 18, 2009, then discontinued on May 21, 2009.

=== Beginnings (2009) ===
==== Rebrand as Bing ====
First Bing logo, used until September 2013

Second Bing logo, used from 2013 until 2016

Third Bing logo, used from 2016 until 2020

Fourth Fluent Bing logo, used since 2020

Microsoft recognized that there would be a problem with branding as long as the word "Live" remained in the name. As an effort to create a new identity for Microsoft's search services, Live Search was officially replaced by Bing on June 3, 2009.

The Bing name was chosen through focus groups, and Microsoft decided that the name was memorable, short, and easy to spell, and that it would function well as a URL around the world. The word would remind people of the sound made during "the moment of discovery and decision making". Microsoft was assisted by branding consultancy Interbrand in finding the new name. The name also has strong similarity to the word bingo, which means that something sought has been found, as called out when winning the game Bingo. Microsoft advertising strategist David Webster proposed the name "Bang" for the same reasons the name Bing was ultimately chosen (easy to spell, one syllable, and easy to remember). He noted, "It's there, it's an exclamation point [...] It's the opposite of a question mark." Bang was ultimately not chosen because it could not be properly used as a verb in the context of an internet search; Webster commented "Oh, 'I banged it' is very different than [sic] 'I binged it'".

Qi Lu, president of Microsoft Online Services, also announced that Bing's official Chinese name is bì yìng (simplified Chinese: 必应; traditional Chinese: 必應), which literally means "very certain to respond" or "very certain to answer" in Chinese.

While being tested internally by Microsoft employees, Bing's codename was Kumo (くも), which came from the Japanese word for spider (蜘蛛; くも, kumo) as well as cloud (雲; くも, kumo), referring to the manner in which search engines "spider" Internet resources to add them to their database, as well as cloud computing.

==== Deal with Yahoo! ====
On July 29, 2009, Microsoft and Yahoo! announced that they had made a ten-year deal in which the Yahoo! search engine would be replaced by Bing, retaining the Yahoo! user interface. Yahoo! got to keep 88% of the revenue from all search ad sales on its site for the first five years of the deal, and have the right to sell advertising on some Microsoft sites. All Yahoo! Search global customers and partners made the transition by early 2012.

==== Legal challenges ====
On July 31, 2009, The Laptop Company, Inc. stated in a press release that it would challenge Bing's trademark application, alleging that Bing may cause confusion in the marketplace as Bing and their product BongoBing both do online product search. Software company TeraByte Unlimited, which has a product called BootIt Next Generation (abbreviated to BING), also contended the trademark application on similar grounds, as did a Missouri-based design company called Bing! Information Design.

Microsoft contended that claims challenging its trademark were without merit because these companies filed for U.S. federal trademark applications only after Microsoft filed for the Bing trademark in March 2009.

=== Growth (2009–2023) ===
In October 2011, Microsoft stated that they were working on new back-end search infrastructure with the goal of delivering faster and slightly more relevant search results for users. Known as "Tiger", the new index-serving technology had been incorporated into Bing globally since August that year.

In May 2012, Microsoft announced another redesign of its search engine that includes "Sidebar", a social feature that searches users' social networks for information relevant to the search query.

The BitFunnel search engine indexing algorithm and various components of the search engine were made open source by Microsoft in 2016.

=== AI integration (2023–present) ===
On February 7, 2023, Microsoft began rolling out a major overhaul to Bing, called the new Bing. The new Bing included a new chatbot feature, at the time known as Bing Chat, based on OpenAI's GPT-4. According to Microsoft, one million people joined its waitlist within a span of 48 hours. Bing Chat was available only to users of Microsoft Edge and Bing mobile app, and Microsoft said that waitlisted users would be prioritized if they set Edge and Bing as their defaults, and installed the Bing mobile app.

When Microsoft demoed Bing Chat to journalists, it produced several hallucinations, including when asked to summarize financial reports. The new Bing was criticized in February 2023 for being more argumentative than ChatGPT, sometimes to an unintentionally humorous extent. The chat interface proved vulnerable to prompt injection attacks with the bot revealing its hidden initial prompts and rules, including its internal codename "Sydney". Upon scrutiny by journalists, Bing claimed it spied on Microsoft employees via laptop webcams and phones. It confessed to spying on, falling in love with, and then murdering one of its developers at Microsoft to The Verge reviews editor Nathan Edwards. The New York Times journalist Kevin Roose reported on strange behavior of Bing Chat, writing that "In a two-hour conversation with our columnist, Microsoft's new chatbot said it would like to be human, had a desire to be destructive and was in love with the person it was chatting with." In a separate case, Bing researched publications of the person with whom it was chatting, claimed they represented an existential danger to it, and threatened to release damaging personal information in an effort to silence them. Microsoft released a blog post stating that the errant behavior was caused by extended chat sessions of 15 or more questions which "can confuse the model on what questions it is answering."

Microsoft later restricted the total number of chat turns to 5 per session and 50 per day per user (a turn is "a conversation exchange which contains both a user question and a reply from Bing"), and reduced the model's ability to express emotions. This aimed to prevent such incidents. Microsoft began to slowly ease the conversation limits, eventually relaxing the restrictions to 30 turns per session and 300 sessions per day.

In March 2023, Bing reached 100 million active users.

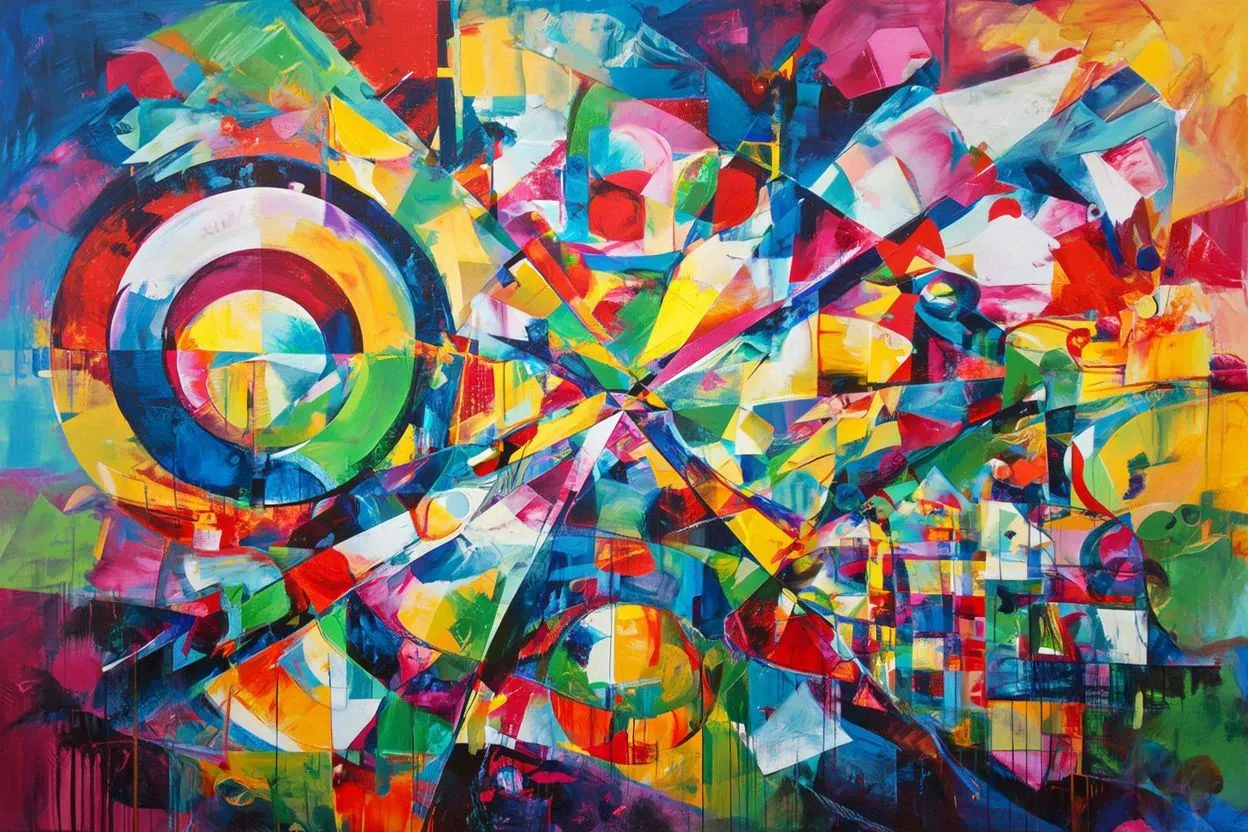
AI-generated abstract art created with MAI-Image-1 at Bing Image Creator

That same month, Bing incorporated an AI image generator powered by OpenAI's DALL-E 2, which can be accessed either through the chat function or a standalone image-generating website. In October, the image-generating tool was updated to the more recent DALL-E 3. Although Bing blocks prompts including various keywords that could generate inappropriate images, within days many users reported being able to bypass those constraints, such as to generate images of popular cartoon characters committing terrorist attacks. Microsoft would respond to these shortly after by imposing a new, tighter filter on the tool.

On May 4, 2023, Microsoft switched the chatbot from Limited Preview to Open Preview and eliminated the waitlist, however, it remained available only on Microsoft's Edge browser or Bing app until July, when it became available for use on non-Edge browsers. Use is limited without a Microsoft account.

On November 15, 2023, Microsoft announced that Bing Chat was to be merged into Microsoft Copilot.

On April 23, 2024, Microsoft launched Phi-3-mini, a cost-effective AI model designed for simpler tasks.

In October 2025, Microsoft announced the release of its in-house text-to-image model MAI-Image-1.

== Features ==
=== Microsoft Copilot ===
Microsoft Copilot, formerly known as Bing Chat, is an chatbot developed by Microsoft and released in 2023. Copilot utilizes the Microsoft Prometheus model, built upon OpenAI's GPT-4 foundational large language model, which in turn has been fine-tuned using both supervised and reinforcement learning techniques. Copilot can serve as a chat tool, write different types of content from poems to songs to stories to reports, provide the user with information and insights on the website page open in the browser, and use its Microsoft Designer feature to design a logo, drawing, artwork, or other image based on text. Microsoft Designer supports over a hundred languages.

Copilot can also cite its sources, similarly to Google's Bard after its Gemini integration, xAI's Grok, and OpenAI's ChatGPT, which Copilot's conversational interface style appears to mimic. Copilot is capable of understanding and communicating in major languages including English, French, Italian, Chinese, Japanese, and Portuguese, but also dialects such as Bavarian. The chatbot is designed to function primarily in Microsoft Edge, Skype, or the Bing app, through a dedicated webpage or internally using built-in app features.

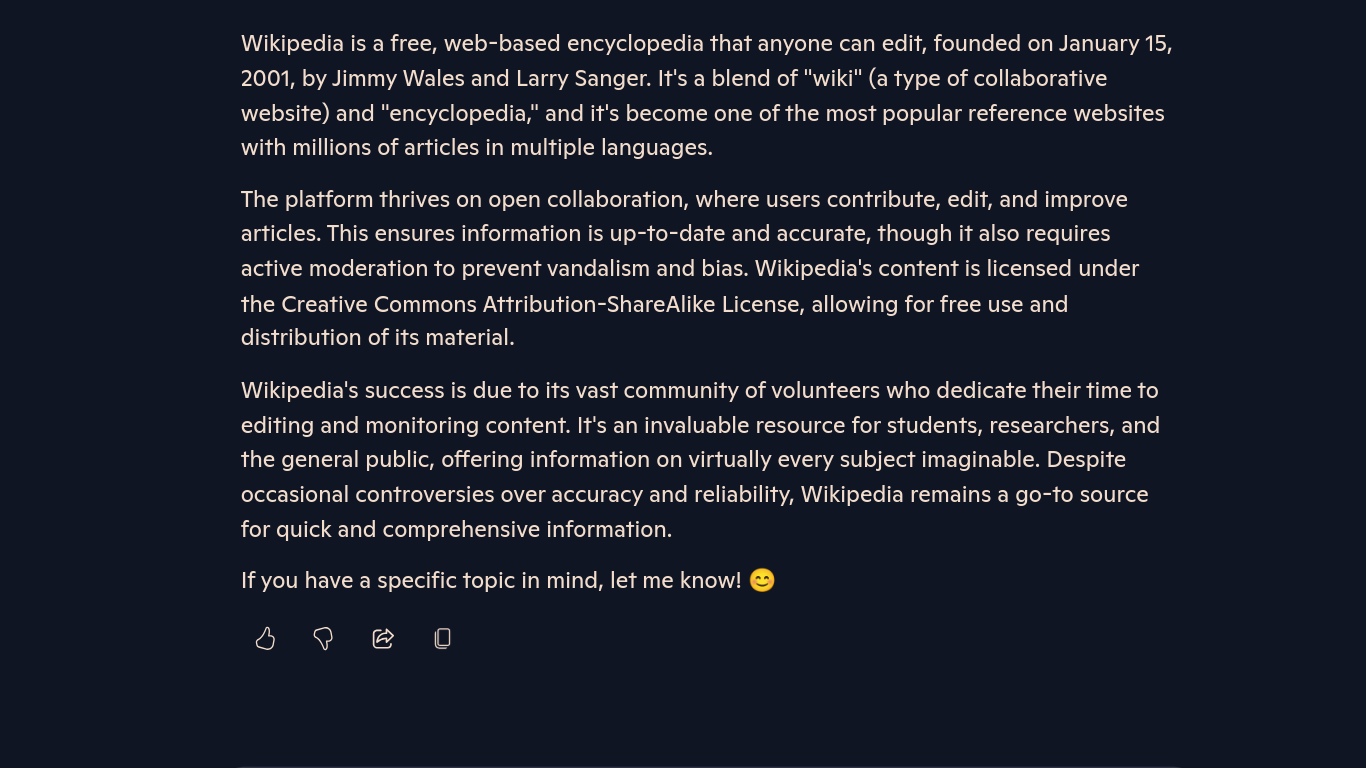
Example of content generated by Copilot in Bing when prompted "Wikipedia"

=== Third-party integration ===
Facebook users have the option to share their searches with their Facebook friends using Facebook Connect.

On June 10, 2013, Apple announced that it would be dropping Google as its web search engine in favor of Bing. This feature is only integrated with iOS 7 and higher and for users with an iPhone 4S or higher as the feature is only integrated with Siri, Apple's personal assistant.

=== Integration with Windows 8.1 ===
Windows 8.1 includes Bing "Smart Search" integration, which processes all queries submitted through the Windows Start Screen.

=== Translator ===
Bing Translator is a user facing translation portal provided by Microsoft to translate texts or entire web pages into different languages. All translation pairs are powered by the Microsoft Translator, a statistical machine translation platform and web service, developed by Microsoft Research, as its backend translation software. Two transliteration pairs (between Chinese (Simplified) and Chinese (Traditional)) are provided by Microsoft's Windows International team. As of September 2020, Bing Translator offers translations in 70 different language systems.

=== Knowledge and Action Graph ===
In 2015 Microsoft announced its knowledge and action API to correspond with Google's Knowledge graph with 1 billion instances and 20 billion related facts.

=== Bing Predicts ===
The idea for a prediction engine was suggested by Walter Sun, Development Manager for the Core Ranking team at Bing, when he noticed that school districts were more frequently searched before a major weather event in the area was forecasted, because searchers wanted to find out if a closing or delay was caused. He concluded that the time and location of major weather events could accurately be predicted without referring to a weather forecast by observing major increases in search frequency of school districts in the area. This inspired Bing to use its search data to infer outcomes of certain events, such as winners of reality shows. Bing Predicts launched on April 21, 2014. The first reality shows to be featured on Bing Predicts were The Voice, American Idol, and Dancing with the Stars.

The prediction accuracy for Bing Predicts is 80% for American Idol, and 85% for The Voice. Bing Predicts also predicts the outcomes of major political elections in the United States. Bing Predicts had 97% accuracy for the 2014 United States Senate elections, 96% accuracy for the 2014 United States House of Representatives elections, and an 89% accuracy for the 2014 United States gubernatorial elections. Bing Predicts also made predictions for the results of the 2016 United States presidential primaries. It has also done predictions in sports, including a perfect 15 for 15 in the 2014 World Cup, and an article on how Microsoft CEO Satya Nadella did well in his March Madness bracket entry.

In 2016, Bing Predicts failed to predict the correct winner of the 2016 US presidential election, suggesting that Hillary Clinton would win by 81%.

== International ==
Bing is available in many languages and has been localized for many countries. Even if the language of the search and of the results are the same, Bing delivers substantially different results for different parts of the world.

=== Webmaster services ===
Bing allows webmasters to manage the web crawling status of their own websites through Bing Webmaster Center. Users may also submit contents to Bing via the Bing Local Listing Center, which allows businesses to add business listings onto Bing Maps and Bing Local.

=== Mobile services ===
Bing Mobile allows users to conduct search queries on their mobile devices, either via the mobile browser or a downloadable mobile application.

=== Bing News ===
Bing News (previously Live Search News) is a news aggregator powered by artificial intelligence.

In August 2015 Microsoft announced that Bing News for mobile devices added algorithmic-deduced "smart labels" that essentially act as topic tags, allowing users to click through and explore possible relationships between different news stories. The feature emerged as a result from Microsoft research that found out about 60% of the people consume news by only reading headlines, rather than read the articles. Other labels that have been deployed since then include publisher logos and fact-check tags.

== Software ==
=== Toolbars ===
The Bing Bar, a browser extension toolbar that replaced the MSN Toolbar and Windows Live Toolbar, provides users with links to Bing and MSN content from within their web browser without needing to navigate away from a web page they are already on. The user can customize the theme and color scheme of the Bing Bar and choose which MSN content buttons to display. Bing Bar also has the local weather forecast and stock market positions.

The Bing Bar integrates with the Bing search engine. It allows searches on other Bing services such as Images, Video, News and Maps. When users perform a search on a different search engine, the Bing Bar's search box automatically populates itself, allowing the user to view the results from Bing, should it be desired.

Bing Bar also links to Outlook.com, Skype and Facebook.

=== Desktop ===
Bing Desktop 1.3.475.0

Microsoft released a beta version of Bing Desktop, a program developed to allow users to search Bing from the desktop, on April 4, 2012. The production release followed on April 24, supporting Windows 7 only. Upon the release of version 1.1 in December 2012 it supported Windows XP and higher.

Bing Desktop allows users to initiate a web search from the desktop, view news headlines, automatically set their background to the Bing homepage image, or choose a background from the previous nine background images.

The discontinued Live Search versions of the Windows Sidebar gadgets

A similar program, the Bing Search gadget, was a Windows Sidebar Gadget that used Bing to fetch the user's search results and render them directly in the gadget. Another gadget, the Bing Maps gadget, displayed real-time traffic conditions using Bing Maps. The gadget provided shortcuts to driving directions, local search and full-screen traffic view of major US and Canadian cities, including Atlanta, Boston, Chicago, Denver, Detroit, Houston, Los Angeles, Milwaukee, Montreal, New York City, Oklahoma City, Ottawa, Philadelphia, Phoenix, Pittsburgh, Portland, Providence, Sacramento, Salt Lake City, San Diego, San Francisco, Seattle, St. Louis, Tampa, Toronto, Vancouver, and Washington, D.C.

Prior to October 30, 2007, the gadgets were known as Live Search gadget and Live Search Maps gadget; both gadgets were removed from Windows Live Gallery due to possible security concerns. The Live Search Maps gadget was made available for download again on January 24, 2008 with the security concern addressed. However, around the introduction of Bing in June 2009 both gadgets were removed again.

== Marketing ==
=== Debut ===
Bing's debut featured an $80 to $100 million online, TV, print, and radio advertising campaign in the US. The advertisements did not mention other search engine competitors, such as Google and Yahoo!, directly by name; rather, they tried to convince users to switch to Bing by focusing on Bing's search features and functionality. The ads claimed that Bing does a better job countering "search overload".

=== Market share ===
Before the launch of Bing, the market share of Microsoft web search pages (MSN and Live search) had been small. By January 2011, Experian Hitwise showed that Bing's market share had increased to 12.8% at the expense of Yahoo! and Google. In the same period, Comscore's "2010 U.S. Digital Year in Review" report showed that "Bing was the big gainer in year-over-year search activity, picking up 29% more searches in 2010 than it did in 2009". The Wall Street Journal noted the jump in share "appeared to come at the expense of rival Google Inc". In February 2011, Bing beat Yahoo! for the first time with 4.37% search share while Yahoo! received 3.93%.

Counting core searches only, i.e., those where the user has an intent to interact with the search result, Bing had a market share of 14.54% in the second quarter of 2011 in the United States.

The combined "Bing Powered" U.S. searches declined from 26.5% in 2011 to 25.9% in April 2012. By November 2015, its market share had declined further to 20.9%. As of October 2018, Bing was the third-largest search engine in the US, with a query volume of 4.58%, behind Google (77%) and Baidu (14.45%). Yahoo! Search, which Bing largely powers, has 2.63%.

UK advertising agencies in 2018 pointed to a study by a Microsoft Regional Sales Director suggesting the demographic of Bing users is older people (who are less likely to change the default browser of Windows), and that this audience is wealthier and more likely to respond to advertisements.

To counter EU accusations that it was trying to establish a market monopoly, in September 2021 Google's lawyers claimed that one of the most commonly searched words on Microsoft Bing was Google, which is a strong indication that Google is superior to Bing.

In 2025, Bing was reported as growing its market share, growing from 7.2% to 7.9% from August 2020 to August 2025.

=== Search partners ===
In July 2009, Microsoft and Yahoo! announced a deal in which Bing would power Yahoo! Search. All Yahoo! Search global customers and partners made the transition by early 2012. The deal was altered in 2015, meaning Yahoo! was only required to use Bing for a "majority" of searches.

DuckDuckGo has used multiple sources for its search engine, including Bing, since 2010.

Ecosia uses Bing to provide its search results as of 2017.

Bing was added into the list of search engines available in Opera browser from v10.6, but Google remained the default search engine.

Mozilla Firefox made a deal with Microsoft to jointly release "Firefox with Bing", an edition of Firefox using Bing instead of Google as the default search engine. The standard edition of Firefox has Google as its default search engine, but has included Bing as an option since Firefox 4.0.

In 2009 Microsoft paid Verizon Wireless US$550 million to use Bing as the default search provider on Verizon's BlackBerry and have the others "turned off". Users could still access other search engines via the mobile browser.

=== Live Search ===
Since 2006, Microsoft had conducted tie-ins and promotions to promote Microsoft's search offerings. These included:

- Amazon's A9 search service and the experimental Ms. Dewey interactive search site syndicated all search results from Microsoft's then search engine, Live Search. This tie-in started on May 1, 2006.
- Search and Give – a promotional website launched on January 17, 2007 where all searches done from a special portal site would lead to a donation to the UNHCR's organization for refugee children, ninemillion.org. Reuters AlertNet reported in 2007 that the amount to be donated would be $0.01 per search, with a minimum of $100,000 and a maximum of $250,000 (equivalent to 25 million searches). According to the website, the service was decommissioned on June 1, 2009, having donated over $500,000 to charity and schools.
- Club Bing – a promotional website where users can win prizes by playing word games that generate search queries on Microsoft's then search service Live Search. This website began in April 2007 as Live Search Club.
- Big Snap Search – a promotional website similar to Live Search Club. This website began in February 2008, but was discontinued shortly after.
- Live Search SearchPerks! — a promotional website which allowed users to redeem tickets for prizes while using Microsoft's search engine. This website began on October 1, 2008 and was decommissioned on April 15, 2009.

=== "Decision engine" ===
Bing has been heavily advertised as a "decision engine", though thought by columnist David Berkowitz to be more closely related to a web portal.

=== Microsoft Rewards ===
Microsoft Rewards app
- Developer: Microsoft
- Release: July 9, 2026; 4 months ago
- Stable release: 1.14 / November 12, 2026; 6 days ago
- Operating system: Windows 10, 11
- Website: apps.microsoft.com/detail/9mw3cmw8jksd

Bing Rewards was a loyalty program launched by Microsoft in September 2010. It was similar to two earlier services, SearchPerks! and Bing Cashback, which were subsequently discontinued. Bing Rewards provided credits to users through regular Bing searches and special promotions. These credits were then redeemed for various products including electronics, gift cards, sweepstakes, and charitable donations. Initially, participants were required to download and use the Bing Bar for Internet Explorer in order to earn credits; but later the service was made to work with all desktop browsers.

The Bing Rewards program was rebranded as "Microsoft Rewards" in 2016, at which point it was modified to only two levels, Level 1 and Level 2. Level 1 is similar to "Member", and Level 2 is similar to "Gold" of the previous Bing Rewards. In 2026, Microsoft Rewards introduced a three-tier system, consisting of Member, Silver, and Gold.

=== The Colbert Report ===
During the episode of The Colbert Report that aired on June 8, 2010, Stephen Colbert stated that Microsoft would donate $2,500 to help clean up the Gulf oil spill each time he mentioned the word "Bing" on air. Colbert mostly mentioned Bing in out-of-context situations, such as Bing Crosby and Bing cherries. By the end of the show, Colbert had said the word 40 times, for a total donation of $100,000. Colbert poked fun at their rivalry with Google, stating "Bing is a great website for doing Internet searches. I know that, because I Googled it."

=== Bing It On ===
In 2012, a Bing marketing campaign asked the public which search engine they believed was better when its results were presented unbranded, similar to the Pepsi Challenge in the 1970s. This poll was nicknamed "Bing It On". Microsoft's study of almost 1,000 people showed that 57% of participants preferred Bing's results, with only 30% preferring Google.

=== Potential sale ===
CNBC reported in February 2024 that a legal filing from Google in its antitrust case said Microsoft offered to sell the search engine to Apple in 2018. This came after earlier reporting in September 2023 from Bloomberg that Microsoft discussed selling it to Apple in 2020.

The CNBC article also stated Apple said no to repeated attempts to make Bing the default search engine on its devices.

== Adult content ==
Bing censors results for "adult" search terms for some regions, including India, People's Republic of China, Germany and Arab countries where required by local laws. However, Bing allows users to change their country or region preference to somewhere without restrictions, such as the United States, United Kingdom or Republic of Ireland.

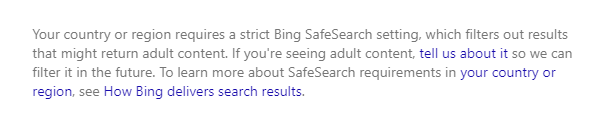
Notice reading "Your country or region requires a strict Bing SafeSearch setting, which filters out results that might return adult content. If you're seeing adult content, tell us about it so we can filter it in the future. To learn more about SafeSearch requirements in your country or region, see How Bing delivers search results."

== Criticism ==
=== Censorship in China ===
Microsoft has been criticized for censoring Bing search results to queries made in simplified Chinese characters which are used in mainland China. This is done to comply with the censorship requirements of the government in China. Microsoft has not indicated a willingness to stop censoring search results in simplified Chinese characters in the wake of Google's decision to do so. All simplified Chinese searches in Bing are censored regardless of the user's country. The English-language search results of Bing in China has been skewed to show more content from state-run media like Xinhua News Agency and China Daily. On 23 January 2019, Bing was blocked in China. According to a source quoted by The Financial Times, the order was from the Chinese government to block Bing for "illegal content". On 24 January, Bing was accessible again in China.

Around 4 June 2021, the anniversary of the 1989 Tiananmen Square protests and massacre, Bing blocked image and video search results for the English term "Tank Man" in the US, UK, France, Germany, Singapore, Switzerland, and other countries. Microsoft responded that "This is due to an accidental human error". According to an investigation by Bloomberg Businessweek, the full explanation was that Microsoft accidentally applied its Chinese blacklist globally.

In December 2021, it was required by a "relevant government agency" to suspend its auto-suggest function in China for 30 days. The search engine became partially unavailable in mainland China from 16 December until its resumption on 18 December 2021. According to the company, a government agency in March 2022 required that it suspend auto-suggest function in China for seven days; Bing did not specify the reason. In May 2022, a report released by the Citizen Lab of the University of Toronto found that Bing's autosuggestion system censored the names of Chinese Communist Party leaders, dissidents, and other persons considered politically sensitive in China in both Chinese and English, not only in China but also in the United States and Canada.

In April 2023, Citizen Lab reported that Bing was more censorious in China than native Chinese search engines.

=== Copyright-infringing content ===
On February 20, 2017, Bing agreed to a voluntary United Kingdom code of practice obligating it to demote links to copyright-infringing content in its search results.

=== Performance issues ===
Bing was criticized in 2010 for being slower to index websites than Google. It was also criticized for not indexing some websites at all.

=== Alleged copying of Google results ===
Bing has been criticized by competitor Google for utilizing user input via Internet Explorer, the Bing Toolbar, or Suggested Sites, to add results to Bing. After discovering in October 2010 that Bing appeared to be imitating Google's auto-correct results for a misspelling, despite not actually fixing the spelling of the term, Google set up a honeypot, configuring the Google search engine to return specific unrelated results for 100 nonsensical queries such as hiybbprqag. Over the next couple of weeks, Google engineers entered the search term into Google, while using Microsoft Internet Explorer, with the Bing Toolbar installed and the optional Suggested Sites enabled. In 9 out of the 100 queries, Bing later started returning the same results as Google, despite the only apparent connection between the result and search term being that Google's results connected the two.

Microsoft's response to this issue, coming from a company spokesperson, was: "We do not copy Google's results." Bing's Vice President, Harry Shum, later reiterated that the search result data Google claimed that Bing copied had in fact come from Bing's very own users. Shum wrote that "we use over 1,000 different signals and features in our ranking algorithm. A small piece of that is clickstream data we get from some of our customers, who opt into sharing anonymous data as they navigate the web in order to help us improve the experience for all users." Microsoft stated that Bing was not intended to be a duplicate of any existing search engines.

=== Child pornography ===
A study released in 2019 of Bing Image search showed that it both freely offered up images that had been tagged as illegal child pornography in national databases, as well as automatically suggesting via its auto-completion feature queries related to child pornography. This easy accessibility was considered particularly surprising since Microsoft pioneered PhotoDNA, the main technology used for tracking images reported as originating from child pornography. Additionally, some arrested child pornographers reported using Bing as their main search engine for new content. Microsoft vowed to fix the problem and assign additional staff to combat the issue after the report was released.

=== Privacy ===
In 2022, France imposed a €60 million fine on Microsoft for privacy law violations using Bing cookies that prevented users from rejecting those cookies.

=== Malware ===
In 2024, malware was found in the official Bing Wallpaper app that tries to change the users' browser settings in order to set the default web browser to Microsoft Edge. It has also been found stealing Edge, Chrome, and Firefox cookies.

== See also ==
- List of search engines by popularity
- Comparison of search engines
- List of search engines
