= List of academic databases and search engines =

This page contains a representative list of major databases and search engines useful in an academic setting for finding and accessing articles in academic journals, institutional repositories, archives, or other collections of scientific and other articles. As the distinction between a database and a search engine is unclear for these complex document retrieval systems, see:

- the general list of search engines for all-purpose search engines that can be used for academic purposes
- the article about bibliographic databases for information about databases giving bibliographic information about finding books and journal articles.

Note that "free" or "subscription" can refer both to the availability of the database or of the journal articles included. This has been indicated as precisely as possible in the list:

== List ==
Name	Discipline(s)	Description	Access cost	Provider(s)
Academic Search	Multidisciplinary	Several versions: Complete, Elite, Premier, and Alumni Edition	Subscription	EBSCO Publishing
Aerospace & High Technology Database	Aerospace, aeronautics, astronautics		Subscription	ProQuest
African Journals OnLine (AJOL)	Multidisciplinary	Scholarly journals published in Africa	Free abstracts; subscription full-text	African Journals OnLine
AgeLine	Sociology, gerontology	Includes information on aging-related topics, including economics, public health and policy	Subscription	EBSCO Publishing
AGRICOLA: Agricultural Online Access	Agriculture		Free & subscription	Produced by the United States National Agricultural Library. Free access provided by NAL. Subscription access provided by ProQuest, OVID.
AGRIS: Agricultural database	Agriculture	Covers agriculture, forestry, animal husbandry, aquatic sciences and fisheries, human nutrition, extension literature from over 100 participating countries. Material includes unique grey literature such as unpublished scientific and technical reports, theses, conference papers, government publications, and more.	Free	Produced by the Food and Agriculture Organization of the United Nations. AGRIS
Airiti Inc	Multidisciplinary		Subscription	Airiti Inc
Analytical Abstracts	Chemistry		Subscription	Royal Society of Chemistry
Analytical Sciences Digital Library	Analytical chemistry		Free	National Science Digital Library and the Analytical Chemistry Division of the American Chemical Society
Anthropological Index Online	Anthropology	Index only (no abstracts or full-text)	Free	Royal Anthropological Institute
Anthropological Literature	Anthropology		Subscription	Maintained by Harvard University. Non-Harvard access provided by OCLC
Arachne	Archaeology, art history	German language	Free	German Archaeological Institute & the University of Cologne
Arnetminer	Computer science	Online service used to index and search academic social networks	Free	Tsinghua University
Arts & Humanities Citation Index	Arts, humanities	Part of Web of Science	Subscription	Clarivate Analytics
arXiv	Physics, mathematics, computer science, nonlinear sciences, quantitative biology and statistics	Repository of electronic pre-prints of papers in the fields of mathematics, physics, astronomy, computer science, quantitative biology, statistics, and quantitative finance.	Free	Cornell University
ASCE Library	Civil engineering	All civil engineering disciplines including structural engineering, geotechnical engineering, transportation engineering, construction engineering, environmental engineering, engineering mechanics, sustainability, water resources, irrigation. hydraulics, hydrology, waterways, urban planning, cold regions	Abstract free. Fulltext subscription.	American Society of Civil Engineers
Association for Computing Machinery Digital Library	Computer science, engineering		Subscription	Association for Computing Machinery
Astrophysics Data System	Astrophysics, geophysics, physics		Free	Harvard University
ATLA Religion Database	Religious studies	Provides information on topics such as biblical studies, world religions, church history, and religion in social issues	Subscription	
AULIMP: Air University Library's Index to Military Periodicals	Military science		Free	Air University
BASE: Bielefeld Academic Search Engine	Multidisciplinary		Free	Bielefeld University
Beilstein database	Organic chemistry		Subscription	Available from Elsevier under the product name Reaxys
Bibliographie de civilisation médiévale	Medieval studies	A bibliography of monographs on the Middle Ages. As of 2018, it contains about 65,000 fully classified bibliographic records.	Subscription	Produced by the University of Poitiers. Available from Brepols Publishers.
Biological Abstracts	Biology	A complete collection of bibliographic references covering life science and biomedical research literature published from more than 4,000 journals internationally.	Subscription	Available from Thomson Reuters
BioOne	Biology, ecology, and environmental science	A full-text aggregation of more than 180 scientific journals publishing current research in Biodiversity Conservation, Biology, Ecology, Environmental Science, Entomology, Ornithology, Plant Science, and Zoology.	Free abstract & references, open access titles, and subscription	Available from BioOne
Book Review Index Online	Book reviews		Subscription	Thomson Gale
Books in Print	Books		Subscription	R.R. Bowker
CAB Abstracts	Applied life sciences	Bibliographic information service providing access to applied life sciences literature.	Subscription	CABI
CEEOL	Humanities and Social Science	repository of full text indexed documents, in the form of journal articles, eBooks and grey literature	Free abstract & references, Open Access titles, and Subscription	Central and Eastern European Online Library GmbH (CEEOL GmbH), Frankfurt am Main
Chemical Abstracts Service	Chemistry		Subscription	American Chemical Society
Chemisches Zentralblatt Structural Database	Science, chemistry	web-based retrieval application that provides language independent access to the information contained in Chemisches Zentralblatt	Subscription	Available from the InfoChem
ChemXSeer	Chemistry	The project seemed abandoned in 2018.	Free	Pennsylvania State University
Chinese Social Sciences Citation Index	Social sciences		Subscription	Nanjing University
CINAHL: Cumulative Index to Nursing and Allied Health	Nursing, allied health		Subscription	EBSCO
CiNii	Multidisciplinary	Database of 15 million articles in the Japanese language from 3600 journals	Free abstracts; subscription full-text	National Institute of Informatics
CHBD: Circumpolar Health Bibliographic Database	Medicine		Free	University of Calgary
Citebase Search	Mathematics, computer science, physics	Semi-autonomous citation index of free online research	Free	University of Southampton
CiteULike	Computer science		Free	
CiteSeer	Computer science	Replaced by CiteSeerX.	Free	Pennsylvania State University
CiteSeerX	Computer science, statistics, mathematics, becoming multidisciplinary		Free	Pennsylvania State University
Civil engineering database	Civil engineering	A bibliographic database covering all of ASCE's publications since 1872	Free	American Society of Civil Engineers
Cochrane Library	Medicine, healthcare	Includes reviews of research to promote evidence-based healthcare.	Subscription	Wiley Interscience
CogPrints: Cognitive Sciences Eprint Archives	Science (general)		Free	University of Southampton
The Collection of Computer Science Bibliographies	Computer science		Free	Alf-Christian Achilles
Compendex	Engineering	Electronic version of Engineering Index.	Subscription	Elsevier
COnnecting REpositories	Multidisciplinary		Free	Open University
Current Index to Statistics	Statistics	Limited free search	Subscription	American Statistical Association and the Institute of Mathematical Statistics
Current Contents	Multidisciplinary	Part of Web of Science. Contains 7 discipline-specific subsets.	Subscription	Clarivate Analytics
Directory of Open Access Journals	Journals	The Directory Of Open Access Journals (DOAJ) lists more than 10,000 open access journals (September 2014) in multiple research areas.	Free	Lund University
dblp computer science bibliography	Computer science	Comprehensive list of papers from major computer science conferences and journals	Free	Produced by Schloss Dagstuhl - Leibniz Center for Informatics and University of Trier, Germany
EconBiz	Economics	EconBiz supports research in and teaching of economics with a central entry point for all kinds of subject-specific information and direct access to full texts.	Free	Produced by the German National Library of Economics – Leibniz Information Centre for Economics (ZBW)
EconLit	Economics	The American Economic Association's electronic database, the world's foremost source of references to economic literature.	Subscription	Produced by the American Economic Association. Available from EBSCOhost, ProQuest, OVID, and AEA.
EMBASE	Biomedicine, pharmacology	Biomedical database with a strong focus on drug and pharmaceutical research.	Subscription	Elsevier
ERIC: Educational Resource Information Center	Education	Education literature and resources. Provides access to over 1.3 million records dating back to 1966.	Free	Produced by the United States Department of Education. Also available by subscription from OCLC, CSA.
Europe PMC	Biomedical	A database of biomedical and life sciences literature with access to full-text research articles and citations. Includes text-mining tools and links to external molecular and medical data sets. A partner in PMC International.	Free	EMBL-EBI
FSTA – Food Science and Technology Abstracts	Food science, food technology, nutrition	The world's leading database of information on food science, food technology and nutrition	Subscription	Produced by IFIS Publishing. FSTA can be accessed through EBSCOhost, IHS Inc., Ovid, Proquest Dialog, STN and Web of Science.
Gale (publisher)	Multidisciplinary		Subscription	Cengage Group
GENESIS	Women's history	Descriptions of women's history collections from sources in the UK, as well as women's history websites.	Free	London Metropolitan University
GeoRef	Geosciences		Subscription	American Geosciences Institute
Global Health	Public health	Specialist bibliographic, abstracting and indexing database dedicated to public health research and practice.	Subscription	CABI
Golm Metabolome Database	Mass spectrometry	The Golm Metabolome Database (GMD) is a reference mass spectra library of biologically active metabolites quantified using gas chromatography (GC) coupled to mass spectrometry (MS).	Free online search; offline use by subscription	Golm Metabolome Database
Google Patents	Patents		Free	Google
Google Scholar	Multidisciplinary		Free	Google
HCI Bibliography	Human-computer interface	An electronic bibliography for most of HCI for researchers, developers, educators, and students	Free	Gary Perlman
HubMed	Medicine	An alternative interface to the PubMed medical literature database	Free	Alf Eaton
IEEE Xplore	Computer science, engineering, electronics		Subscription	IEEE
Index Copernicus	Multidisciplinary science	Scientific journal database – the IC Journal Master List – contains currently over 2,500 journals from all over the world, including 700 journals from Poland. The journals registered in this database underwent rigorous, multidimensional parameterization, proving high quality. The Ministry of Science and Higher Education acknowledged the IC Journal Master List by placing it on the list of scored databases, for being indexed in IC JML journals get additional points in the Ministry's evaluation process.	Free	Index Copernicus International
Index Theologicus	Theology, religious studies	International scientific open access bibliography for theology and religious studies. The IxTheo lists monographs, collected works, journals, essays, encyclopaedia articles, reviews as well as databases, archive materials, literary remains, blogs, podcasts, research data and other electronically available content from all fields of theology. The analysis is carried out across languages, media and denominations. In addition to current theological literature in numerous languages, the database also contains historical titles dating back to the 16th century. Over 1,200 international theological and religious studies journals are continuously analysed and indexed with all articles and reviews.	Free	IxTheo
Information Bridge: Department of Energy Scientific and Technical Information	Multidisciplinary	The Information Bridge: DOE Scientific and Technical Information provides free public access to over 266,000 full-text documents and bibliographic citations of Department of Energy (DOE) research report literature. Documents are primarily from 1991 forward and were produced by DOE, the DOE contractor community, and/or DOE grantees. Legacy documents are added as they become available in electronic format.	Free	United States Department of Energy, Office of Scientific and Technical Information
Informit	Multidisciplinary	Australasian aggregator of bibliographic databases and journals	Subscription	RMIT Training Pty Ltd
IngentaConnect	Multidisciplinary		Free searching; subscription full-text	Ingenta
Indian Citation Index	Multidisciplinary	Indian Citation Index (ICI) is a home grown abstracts and citation database, with multidisciplinary objective knowledge contents from about 1000 top Indian scholarly journals. It provides powerful search engine to fulfill search and evaluation purposes for researchers, policy makers, decision makers etc.	Subscription	ICI
IARP	Multidisciplinary	Open-access knowledge management system incorporating grants, publications, conferences in natural and social & behavioral sciences. The site provides tools to build graphic reports.	Free	Volunteer collaboration
Inspec	Physics, engineering, computer science	The leading bibliographic database providing abstracts and indexing to the world's scientific and technical papers in physics, electrical engineering, electronics, communications, control engineering, computing, information technology, manufacturing, production, and mechanical engineering.	Subscription	IET
INSPIRE-HEP	Physics (high energy)		Free	CERN, DESY, Fermilab, SLAC and IHEP
International Bibliography of Humanism and the Renaissance	Renaissance studies	A bibliography of academic publications on European culture and history in the 16th and 17th centuries. As of 2018, it contains about 355,000 fully classified bibliographic records.	Subscription	Brepols Publishers
International Directory of Philosophy	Philosophy	Contains information on university philosophy departments and programs, philosophical societies, research centers, journals, and philosophy publishers in the U.S., Canada, and approximately 130 other countries.	Free search; full access by subscription	Philosophy Documentation Center
International Medieval Bibliography	Medieval studies	A multidisciplinary bibliographic database covering Europe, North Africa and the Middle East for the entire period from AD 300 to 1500. As of 2018, it contains about 440,000 entries.	Subscription	Produced by Leeds University. Available from Brepols Publishers.
International Philosophical Bibliography	Philosophy	A bibliographic database focusing on the history of philosophy and continental philosophy.	Subscription	Produced the Université Catholique de Louvain. Available from Peeters Publishers.
J-Gate	All scholarly journals	J-Gate is an electronic gateway to global e-journal literature. J-Gate provides seamless access to millions of journal articles.	Free abstract & references, Open Access titles, and Subscription	Available from J-Gate
JournalSeek	Multidisciplinary	Open access journals in different language	Links to journal's home page and publishers	JournalSeek
JSTOR: Journal Storage	Multidisciplinary	JSTOR Collections: Current Journals; Archived Journals (first issue through 3–5 years ago); Books; and Primary Source Collections; FREE Resources: 3 articles every 2 weeks (Register and Read Program, archived journals). Also, early journals (prior to 1923 in US, 1870 elsewhere) free, no registry necessary.	Free and Subscription	JSTOR
Jurn	Multidisciplinary	Jurn is a free-to-use online search tool for finding and downloading free full-text scholarly works. In 2014 Jurn expanded beyond open access journals in the arts and humanities, to also index open journals in ecology, science, biomedical, business and economics. Jurn is actively curated and maintained.	Free	Jurn
L'Année philologique	Classical studies	Over 860,000 bibliographical entries, including keywords, abstracts, and links to the full text.	Subscription	Produced by the Société Internationale de Bibliographie Classique. Available from Brepols Publishers.
Lesson Planet	Education (K-12)	Over 400,000 teacher-reviewed classroom resources including lesson plans, worksheets, educational videos, and education articles.	Free Abstract; subscription full-text	Lesson Planet
LexisNexis	Law (general)	Electronic database for legal and public-records related information	Subscription	Reed Elsevier
Lingbuzz	Linguistics	A free archive of linguistics articles, with a focus on syntax, semantics, phonology and morphology.	Free	Center for Advanced Study in Theoretical Linguistics, University of Tromsø
Linguamatics	Medicine, healthcare, patents	Interface for searching MEDLINE, ClinicalTrials.gov, FDA Drug Labels, PubMed Central, and Patent Abstracts.	Subscription	Linguamatics
MathSciNet	Mathematics	Available in print as Mathematical Reviews	Subscription	American Mathematical Society
MEDLINE	Medicine, healthcare	Easy-to-use interface to search and retrieve citations and abstracts for biomedical and health journals.	Subscription	EBSCO
MedlinePlus	Medicine		Free	Produced by the United States National Library of Medicine, the United States National Institutes of Health, and the United States Department of Health and Human Services
Mendeley	Multidisciplinary	The Mendeley research catalog is a crowdsourced database of research documents. Researchers have uploaded nearly 100M documents into the catalog with additional contributions coming directly from subject repositories like Pubmed Central and Arxiv.org or web crawls.	Free	Mendeley
Merck Index	Chemistry, biology, pharmacology	Also available in print.	Subscription	Formerly produced by Merck & Co., now available from the Royal Society of Chemistry
Meteorological and Geoastrophysical Abstracts	Meteorology, astrophysics, geology		Subscription	Produced by the American Meteorological Society. Available from Dialog and CSA.
NBER: National Bureau of Economic Research	Economics		Free	National Bureau of Economic Research
Microsoft Academic	Multidisciplinary	Provides many innovative ways to explore scientific papers, conferences, journals, and authors	Free	Microsoft
Microsoft Academic Search	Multidisciplinary		Free	Microsoft
MyScienceWork	Science	Database includes more than 70 million scientific publications and 12 million patents.	Free	MyScienceWork
National Criminal Justice Reference Service	Criminology, sociology	Abstracts of scholarly journal articles, agency and NGO reports, and conference proceedings	Free	United States Department of Justice, Office of Justice Programs
National Diet Library Collection	Multidisciplinary	Japanese. Catalog for the National Library of Japan.	—N/a	National Diet Library
OAIster	Multidisciplinary		Free	OCLC
Open Web Index		Primarily used by researchers at the moment - index of web with special focus on European websites.		University of Passau, Open Search Foundation
OpenAlex	Multidisciplinary		Free	OurResearch
OpenEdition.org	Humanities, social science	OpenEdition offers the academic community four international-scale publication and information platforms in the humanities and social sciences	Free	Cléo (UMS 3287) CNRS EHESS University of Avignon
OpenSIGLE	Grey literature	Indexes European grey literature.	Free	Institut de l'information scientifique et technique
Paperity	Multidisciplinary	Aggregator of open access journals and papers. Contains more than 1,500,000 full-text articles and 4,200 journals covering all academic disciplines and different languages. Provides full-text article search, RSS feeds and a mobile application to access the literature.	Free	Paperity
Philosophy Documentation Center eCollection	Applied ethics, philosophy, religious studies	Journals, series, conference proceedings, and other works from several countries online.	Free abstract & preview; subscription full-text	Philosophy Documentation Center
Philosophy Research Index	Philosophy	Index of books, journals, dissertations, and other documents	Subscription	Philosophy Documentation Center
PhilPapers	Philosophy		Free	PhilPapers
POIESIS: Philosophy Online Serials	Philosophy, applied ethics, religious studies	Journals and series, online access for institutions with print	Free abstract & preview; subscription full-text	Philosophy Documentation Center
POPLINE	Population, family planning, reproductive health	POPLINE® contains the world's most comprehensive collection of population, family planning and related reproductive health and development literature. An international resource, POPLINE helps program managers, policy makers, and service providers in low- and middle-income countries and in development-supportive agencies and organizations gain access to journal articles and other scientific, technical, and programmatic publications.	Free	Knowledge for Health, Center for Communication Programs, Johns Hopkins Bloomberg School of Public Health
Project MUSE	Humanities, social science	Project MUSE is a provider of digital humanities and social science content for the scholarly community. MUSE provides full-text versions of scholarly journals and books.	Subscription	Project MUSE, Johns Hopkins University Press
PsycINFO	Psychology	The largest resource devoted to peer-reviewed literature in behavioral science and mental health. It contains over 3.7 million records with bibliographic information and extensive indexing, more than 60 million cited references, and has comprehensive coverage dating back to the mid-19th century, with sporadic coverage going back as far as the 16th century.	Subscription	Produced by the APA. Available from several database vendors.
Psychology's Feminist Voices	Psychology	An online, multimedia digital archive containing the profiles of 250 feminist psychologists who have shaped and continue to transform the discipline of psychology. Profiles are organized in two sections, "Women Past" and "Feminist Presence." All profiles on the Feminist Presence section contain original interview transcripts and video clips with the psychologist discussing their feminist development and academic career.	Free	Based at York University, Toronto, Canada
PubChem	Chemistry		Free	National Center for Biotechnology Information and the U.S. National Library of Medicine
PubMed	Biomedical	A database primarily of references and abstracts on life sciences and biomedical topics	Free	National Institutes of Health and the U.S. National Library of Medicine
PubPsych	Psychology	PubPsych is a free information retrieval system for psychological resources. It offers a comprehensive and balanced selection of resources from a growing number of international databases with a European focus, covering the needs of academic and professional psychologists.	Free	Leibniz Institute for Psychology Information
Questia: Online Research Library	Multidisciplinary (historical)		Subscription	Questia
Readers' Guide to Periodical Literature	Journals and magazines	Coverage: 1983–present.	Subscription	H. W. Wilson Company
Reader's Guide Retrospective: 1890–1982	Journals and magazines		Subscription	H. W. Wilson Company
RePEc: Research Papers in Economics	Economics		Free	Volunteer collaboration
Reader's Guide Retrospective: 1890–1982	Journals and magazines		Subscription	H. W. Wilson Company
RePEc: Research Papers in Economics	Economics		Free	Volunteer collaboration
Rock's Backpages	Music	Primary documents from the history of rock and roll	Subscription. Limited free access with registration.	Backpages Limited
Russian Science Citation Index	Scientific journals	A bibliographic database of scientific publications in Russian.	Free	Scientific Electronic Library
SafetyLit	Multidisciplinary	Citations and abstracts of journal articles and reports from researchers working in the more than 35 distinct professional disciplines (architecture – zoology) relevant to preventing unintentional injuries, violence, and self-harm.	Free	SafetyLit Foundation in cooperation with the Graduate School of Public Health, San Diego State University and the World Health Organization's Department of Violence and Injury Prevention
SciELO	Journals	SciELO is a bibliographic database and a model for cooperative electronic publishing in developing countries originally from Brazil. It contains 985 scientific journals from different countries in free and universal access, full-text format.	Free	FAPESP, CNPq, and BIREME
Science.gov	Multidisciplinary	A gateway to government science information and research results. Science.gov provides a search of over 45 scientific databases and 200 million pages of science information with just one query, and is a gateway to over 2000 scientific Websites.	Free	Science.gov Alliance, 18 scientific and technical organizations from 14 federal agencies that contribute to Science.gov. United States Department of Energy, Office of Scientific and Technical Information serves as the operating agent for Science.gov.
Science Accelerator	Multidisciplinary	A gateway to results of DOE research and development and major R&D accomplishments of interest to DOE.	Free	United States Department of Energy, Office of Scientific and Technical Information
Science Citation Index	Science (general)	Part of Web of Science	Subscription	Clarivate Analytics
ScienceOpen	Multidisciplinary	Search engine for natural and physical sciences, social sciences, and humanities. Incorporates arXiv, PubMed, and SciELO. Integrated with ORCID for overlay and peer review services. All articles display Altmetric scores.	Free	ScienceOpen
Scientific Information Database (SID)	Engineering, technology, medical science, basic science, human sciences	It is a free bank with multipurpose goals, containing engineering & technology, medical, basic science, human sciences papers.	Free	Scientific Information Database
SCIndeks – Serbian Citation Index	Multidisciplinary	A combination of an online multidisciplinary bibliographic database, a national citation index, an Open Access full-text journal repository and an electronic publishing platform.	Free	CEON/CEES – Centre for Evaluation in Education and Science, Serbia
Science Direct	Science, including medicine		Subscription	Elsevier
Scopus	Multidisciplinary	Scopus is the world's largest abstract and citation database of peer-reviewed research literature. It contains over 20,500 titles from more than 5,000 international publishers. While it is a subscription product, authors can review and update their profiles via ORCID.org or by first searching for their profile at the free Scopus author lookup page.	Subscription	Elsevier
Semantic Scholar	Multidisciplinary	It is designed to quickly highlight the most important papers and identify the connections between them.	Free	Allen Institute for Artificial Intelligence
SemOpenAlex	Multidisciplinary	SemOpenAlex extends the capabilities of OpenAlex by providing semantic representations of scholarly metadata. It integrates knowledge graph-based features to enhance the discovery of research trends, collaborations, and literature interconnections across all domains.	Free	OpenAlex Project
Social Science Citation Index	Social science	Part of Web of Science	Subscription	Clarivate Analytics
Socol@r: Socolar	Multidisciplinary	Scholarly open access resources in different language	Free abstracts; links to full-text	Socolar
SPRESI Database	Science, chemistry	chemical structure and reaction database, product name: SPRESIweb, SPRESImobile	Subscription	Available from InfoChem
SSRN: Social Science Research Network	Social science	Contains an abstracts database and an electronic paper collection, arranged by discipline.	Free	Social Science Electronic Publishing, Inc.
Sparrho	Multidisciplinary	Sparrho is a personalised platform that allows users to discover, curate and share over 60 million scientific research articles and patents from 45k+ journals and preprint servers.	Free	Sparrho
INSPIRE-HEP	Physics (high energy)		Free	CERN, DESY, Fermilab, SLAC and IHEP
The Lens	Multidisciplinary	The Lens functions as an aggregation platform, drawing bibliometric data from various sources such as Crossref, PubMed, Microsoft Academic, and OpenAlex, and integrating them using advanced analytics to provide enriched, contextual information.	Free	Cambia
SpringerLink	Multidisciplinary		Free abstract & preview; subscription full-text	Springer
Ulrich's Periodicals Directory	Periodicals		Subscription	ProQuest
VET-Bib	Social science, education	European vocational education and training (VET) literature	Free	European Centre for the Development of Vocational Training
Web of Science	Multidisciplinary	Includes other products, such as Social Science Citation Index, Science Citation Index, Biological Abstracts & The Zoological Record	Subscription	Clarivate Analytics
WestLaw	Law (general)		Subscription	Thomson Reuters
WorldCat	Multidisciplinary	Unified catalog of member libraries' catalogs	Free & subscription	OCLC
WorldWideScience	Multidisciplinary	WorldWideScience is a global science gateway composed of national and international scientific databases and portals. WorldWideScience accelerates scientific discovery and progress by providing one-stop searching of databases from around the world. Multilingual WorldWideScience provides real-time searching and translation of globally dispersed multilingual scientific literature.	Free	The WorldWideScience Alliance, a multilateral partnership, consists of participating member countries and provides the governance structure for WorldWideScience. United States Department of Energy, Office of Scientific and Technical Information serves as the operating agent for WorldWideScience.
Zasshi Kiji Sakuin: Japanese Periodicals Index	Journals	Japanese.	Free	National Diet Library's Online Catalog, MagazinePlus, CiNii
Zentralblatt MATH	Mathematics	First three records free without subscription.	Subscription	Springer Science+Business Media
The Zoological Record	Zoology	Unofficial register of scientific names & papers in zoology. Coverage 1864–present.	Subscription	Clarivate Analytics

== See also ==
- Academic publishing
- Google Scholar
- Lists of databases
- List of digital library projects
- List of educational video websites
- List of neuroscience databases
- List of online databases
- List of online encyclopedias
- List of open access journals
- Lists of academic journals
