= Science Accelerator =

Science Accelerator was a web-based gateway to science information (Academic databases and search engines) including research results from the U.S. Department of Energy (DOE). The information was provided as a free public service by the DOE Office of Scientific and Technical Information (OSTI), within the Office of Science. It used federated search technology to search DOE-generated and DOE-related science information databases and collections. Federated search technology allowed the user to search multiple data sources with a single query in real time. It provided simultaneous access to "deep web" scientific databases, which were typically not searchable by commercial search engines.

== History ==
Science Accelerator was developed by the Office of Scientific and Technical Information (OSTI) and functioned from 2007 to 2014. Through this initiative, OSTI introduced scalability in federated government search technology. Science Accelerator was the DOE contribution to Science.gov and WorldWideScience.org, and searched 12 DOE databases.

== Content ==
Science Accelerator returned results from 12 DOE databases of science information and research results:

- Electronic full-text research reports (including DOE scientific and technical information)
- Energy citations (going back to the Manhattan Project era)
- Patents
- Ongoing research project summaries
- DOE accomplishments including Nobel Laureates
- Collections of DOE non-text data
- E-prints (journal article pre-publication drafts and scholarly papers)
- Proceedings and papers from science conferences

See Academic databases and search engines.

== Features and capabilities ==
A basic search and an advanced search were provided. The advanced search allowed searching by author, title, and/or date, and/or selecting any of the resources or subsets of those resources. It provided a variety of features and capabilities, including:

- Clustering of results by subtopics or dates to help users target their search
- Wikipedia results related to user search terms
- Eureka Science News results related to user search terms
- RSS service
- Email option for sending results to friends and colleagues
- Enhanced information related to the user's real-time search
- Alerts service
- XML service
- Tag cloud information
- Widget
