= VET-Bib =

Bibliographic database

- Producer: European Centre for the Development of Professional Training (Greece)
- Languages: English, French, German, Bulgarian, Czech, Danish, Dutch, Estonian, Finnish, Hungarian, Greek, Icelandic, Italian, Latvian, Lithuanian, Maltese, Polish, Portuguese, Romanian, Slovak, Slovene, Spanish, Swedish

Access
- Providers: Cedefop
- Cost: Free

Coverage
- Disciplines: Professional education, professional training, skills
- Record depth: Index, abstract
- Format coverage: EU legislation, research reports, policy documents, statistics, best practices, case studies, conference proceedings, journal articles, glossaries and comparative studies at EU, international and national levels, dissertations, websites etc.
- Temporal coverage: 1975-present
- Geospatial coverage: Worldwide, with emphasis on European Union and its member states
- No. of records: > 80.000
- Update frequency: Continuously

Links
- Website: libserver.cedefop.europa.eu

VET-Bib is a bibliographic database covering European professional education literature maintained by the European Centre for the Development of Professional Training (Cedefop).

The Cedefop library exists since 1975. One of its main tasks is to provide reference services on VET.

== Database content ==
VET-Bib contains over 80.000 references on the topics related to Cedefop's priorities:

- professional education and training (VET) policy and systems
- qualifications, competences and skills
- professional guidance and career counselling
- skill needs and shortages
- adult education, continuous and lifelong learning
- informal learning and nonformal learning
- training research
- VET teachers and trainers
- assessment and recognition of learning outcomes and diplomas
- European tools such as the European Qualifications Framework, Europass, and the European Credit System for Professional Education and Training
- labour mobility and migrant workers

Approximately two thirds of the complete VET-Bib collection is available in full text. VET-Bib is multilingual and all European Union languages are represented in the database.

== Database development ==
The development of VET-Bib is shared between the following institutions:

- Cedefop's library and documentation service: responsible for European and international references, also provides guidelines for collection development, and the indexing tool European Training Thesaurus
- , Cedefop's decentralised network consisting of 27 partners in all EU member states plus Norway and Iceland: each national ReferNet partner provides national references to VET-Bib

== Sub products ==
- VET-Alert: a monthly review on what has just been published on professional education
- VET bibliographies: These are thematic pre-defined bibliographies on key topics of professional education: skill needs, E-learning, Validation of non-formal and informal learning, green skills, lifelong guidance, lifelong learning, etc.

== See also ==
- Education Resources Information Center
- International Bibliography of the Social Sciences
- List of academic databases and search engines
