= Circumpolar Health Bibliographic Database =

Electronic bibliographic database

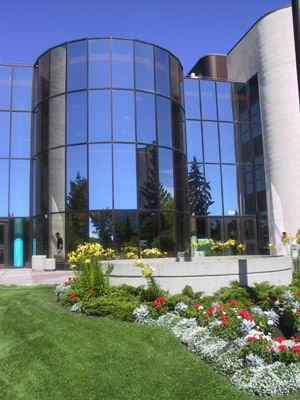
University of Calgary

The Circumpolar Health Bibliographic Database (CHBD) is a free electronic database of abstracts, citations, geographic and subject indexing, library codes and their links to full text publications, both peer-reviewed and gray literature.

== History ==
Established in 2007, it contains more than sixty five hundred records that describe human health in the circumpolar region. The CHBD is a circumpolar chronic disease prevention project of the Canadian Institutes of Health Research. It is maintained by the University of Calgary in Calgary, Alberta, Canada.

== Database ==
The CHBD was initially constructed with records from the Arctic Institute of North America's database. These were mainly northern Canadian records. It is expected to take several years to add non-Canadian records to the CHBD. The Circumpolar Health Observatory, proposed in May 2008 in Norway, would disseminate its data through the CHBD.

== Funding ==
Funding for the database increased by 50% for the period of 2008-2009.

== See also ==
- International Journal of Circumpolar Health
- List of academic databases and search engines
