= Scientific Information Database =

Iranian online academic database

Scientific Information Database, Iran
- logo
- Company type: Bibliographic database
- Headquarters: Tehran, Iran
- Website: sid.ir

Scientific Information Database (SID) of Academic Center for Education, Culture and Research (Persian: پایگاه اطلاعات علمی جهاد دانشگاهی) is an Iranian free accessible website for indexing academic journals and access to full text or metadata of Academic publishing.

== Features ==
- Institute for Scientific Information indexed articles

== See also ==
- List of academic databases and search engines
