= Golm =

Golm could refer to:

- Golm (Potsdam)
- Golm, Austria
- Golm (Groß Miltzow)
- Golm (Zichow)
- Alt Golm
- Neu Golm
- Golm (Usedom)
- Golm Metabolome Database
