= BASE (search engine) =

Academic search engine

BASE (Bielefeld Academic Search Engine)
- Logo

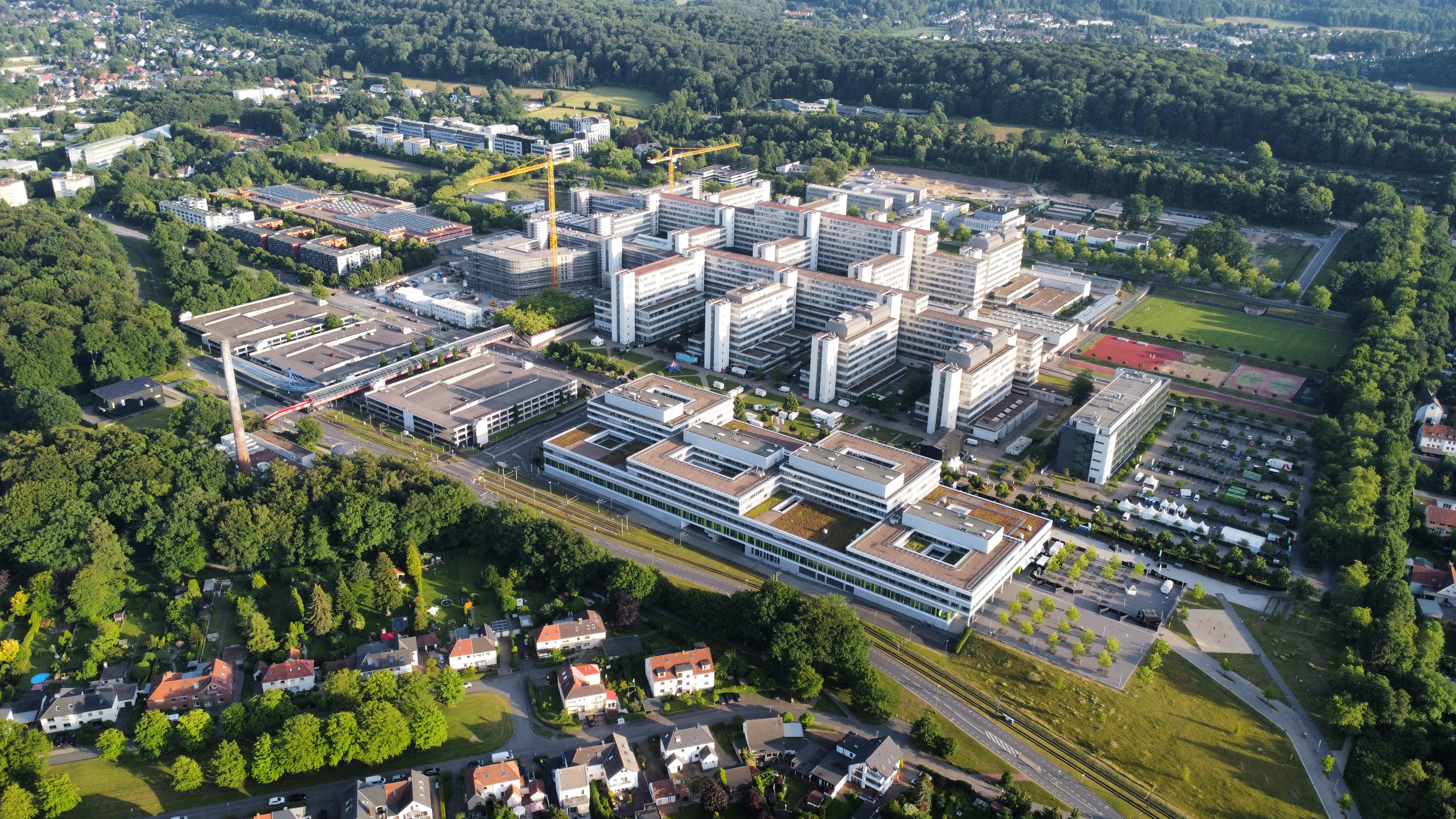
- Aerial view of Bielefeld University with recognizable construction progress at the new main entrance from June 15th, 2022
- Website type: Academic Internet search engine
- Available in: Chinese (simplified), German, English, French, Spanish (Castilian), Polish, Greek, Ukrainian
- Area served: Worldwide
- Owner: Bielefeld University Library
- Website: www.base-search.net
- Commercial: No
- Registration: Optional
- Launched: June 24, 2004; 22 years ago
- Current status: Active

BASE (Bielefeld Academic Search Engine) is a multi-disciplinary search engine to scholarly internet resources, created by Bielefeld University Library in Bielefeld, Germany. It is based on free and open-source software such as Apache Solr and VuFind. It harvests OAI metadata from institutional repositories and other academic digital libraries that implement the Open Archives Initiative Protocol for Metadata Harvesting (OAI-PMH), and then normalizes and indexes the data for searching. In addition to OAI metadata, the library indexes selected web sites and local data collections, all of which can be searched via a single search interface.

== History ==
BASE was developed at the German university of Bielefeld beginning in 2002. The project's initial goal was to develop a search engine that would provide users access to the university's research resources. Yet as the initiative advanced, the creators came to see the need for a more thorough search engine that might provide users access to academic resources outside of the university.

The initial iteration of BASE was released as a prototype in 2004 and made accessible to the general public for testing. The search engine was created to index and offer access to scholarly materials such as journals, institutional repositories, and digital collections as well as scientific publications. The search engine's creators emphasized on ensuring open access to scientific knowledge and made sure that its search results only included materials that were publicly available through the web.

Over the next few years, BASE continued to grow and develop. The search engine was refined and improved, and it began to attract users from all over the world. In 2007, the project received funding from the German Research Foundation (DFG) to further develop and improve the search engine.

BASE provides access to academic resources across multiple disciplines and languages.

In addition to providing access to scholarly resources, BASE has also been involved in several projects and initiatives aimed at promoting open access and improving scholarly communication. For example, the search engine has been involved in the development of the Open Archives Initiative Protocol for Metadata Harvesting (OAI-PMH), which is used to facilitate the exchange of metadata between digital repositories.

Overall, BASE has played an important role in the development of open access and the democratization of knowledge. Its commitment to providing free and open access to scholarly resources has made it an important resource for researchers and scholars around the world.

== Functionality ==
Users can search bibliographic metadata including abstracts, if available. However, BASE does not currently offer full text search. It contrasts with commercial search engines in multiple ways, including in the types and kinds of resources it searches and the information it offers about the results it finds. Results can be narrowed down using drill down menus (faceted search). Bibliographic data is provided in several formats, and the results may be sorted by multiple fields, such as by author or year of publication.

Paying customers include EBSCO Information Services who integrated BASE into their EBSCO Discovery Service (EDS). Non-commercial services can integrate BASE search for free using an API. BASE has become an increasingly important component of open access initiatives concerned with enhancing the visibility of their digital archive collections.

On 6 October 2016, BASE surpassed the 100 million documents threshold having indexed 100,183,705 documents from 4,695 content sources. As of 2022, it had indexed over 315 million documents from over 10,000 sources.

== See also ==
- List of academic databases and search engines
- CORE (research service)
- Open access in Germany
- Google Scholar

== Literature ==
- Lossau, Norbert. 2004. "Search Engine Technology and Digital Libraries: Libraries Need to Discover the Academic Internet," D-Lib Magazine, Volume 10, Number 6, June 2004. doi:10.1045/june2004-lossau
- Summann, Friedrich and Norbert Lossau. 2004. "Search Engine Technology and Digital Libraries: Moving from Theory to Practice," D-Lib Magazine, Volume 10, Number 9, September 2004. doi:10.1045/september2004-lossau
