= CENDI =

CENDI (Commerce, Energy, NASA, Defense Information Managers Group) is an interagency group of senior Scientific and Technical Information (STI) managers from 14 United States federal agencies. CENDI managers cooperate by exchanging information and ideas, collaborating to address common issues, and undertaking joint initiatives. CENDI's accomplishments range from impacting federal information policy to educating a broad spectrum of stakeholders on all aspects of federal STI systems, including its value to research and the taxpayer, and to operational improvements in agency and interagency STI operations.

== History ==
CENDI traces its roots to the Committee on Scientific and Technical Information (COSATI) of the Federal Council on Science and Technology. COSATI was established in the early 1960s to coordinate the management of the results from the U.S. government's increasing commitment to scientific research and technology development. The scientific and technical information (STI) managers of the government's major research and development (R&D) agencies worked within COSATI to standardize guidelines for cataloging and indexing technical reports. COSATI ceased formal operations in the early 1970s.

To continue the cooperation begun under COSATI, managers of agency STI programs from Commerce (National Technical Information Service), Energy (Office of Scientific and Technical Information), NASA (HQ/STI Division), and Defense (Defense Technical Information Center) began meeting periodically to discuss common topics and stimulate more effective cooperation.

In 1985, a Memorandum of Understanding was signed by the four charter agencies and CENDI was established. From this small core of STI managers, CENDI has grown to its current membership, which represents the major science agencies, the national libraries, and agencies involved in the dissemination and long-term management of scientific and technical information.

The vision of CENDI is to facilitate cooperative enterprise where capabilities are shared and challenges are faced together so that the sum of the accomplishments is greater than each individual agency can achieve on its own amongst federal STI agencies.

The abbreviation CENDI refers to the "Commerce, Energy, NASA, Defense Information Managers Group".

== Membership ==
New members from other federal R&D information organizations may be admitted by unanimous agreement of the members. However, it is the intent of the group that membership in CENDI should remain small and focus on organizations with STI or supporting responsibilities. Each agency provides funding to CENDI.

== Members ==
The members of CENDI are:

- Defense Technical Information Center (United States Department of Defense)
- Office of Research and Development and Office of Environmental Information (United States Environmental Protection Agency)
- Government Printing Office
- Library of Congress
- NASA Scientific and Technical Information Program
- National Agricultural Library (United States Department of Agriculture)
- National Archives and Records Administration
- National Library of Education (United States Department of Education)
- National Library of Medicine (United States Department of Health and Human Services)
- National Science Foundation
- National Technical Information Service (United States Department of Commerce)
- National Transportation Library (United States Department of Transportation)
- Office of Scientific and Technical Information (United States Department of Energy)
- USGS/Biological Resources Discipline (United States Department of the Interior)

== Mission and operation ==
CENDI's mission is to help improve the productivity of federal science- and technology-based programs through effective scientific, technical, and related information support systems. In fulfilling its mission, CENDI agencies play an important role in addressing science- and technology-based national priorities and strengthening U.S. competitiveness.

=== Goals ===
1. STI Coordination and Leadership: Provide coordination and leadership for information exchange on important STI policy issues.
2. Improvement of STI Systems: Promote the development of improved STI systems through the productive interrelationship of content and technology.
3. STI Understanding: Promote better understanding of STI and STI management.

=== Principals and Alternates ===
CENDI is made up of senior federal STI managers and each organization appoints a Principal representative. This person is the point of contact for that organization within CENDI. Each Principal has an Alternate. The Principals and Alternates comprise the main group that meets on a regular basis, usually every other month.

=== Secretariat ===
A Tennessee-based information management company, -- Information International Associates, Inc., currently serves as the CENDI Secretariat. The Secretariat provides day-to-day operations to CENDI. The Secretariat prepares the necessary materials for the Principals' meetings, provides support for the working group and task group meetings, assists in developing papers, and maintains the CENDI files and outreach tools.

=== Task Groups and Working Groups ===
The chair(s) of a working group is appointed by the Principals and has the overall responsibility for the group's activities. The Secretariat provides support at the request of the Working Group chair(s).

The Working Groups and Task Groups that are currently operating are:

1. Copyright and Intellectual Property Working Group
2. Distribution Markings Task Group
3. Digital Preservation Task Group
4. Digitization Specifications Task Group
5. Image Metadata Task Group
6. Science.gov (see below)
7. STI Policy Working Group
8. Terminology Resources Task Group

=== Science.gov and Worldwidescience.org ===
In 2001, in response to the April 2001 workshop on "Strengthening the Public Information Infrastructure for Science", and taking into consideration a request from Firstgov (now USA.gov) to develop specialized topical portals, CENDI formed an alliance to develop an interagency website for access to STI. This website, called Science.gov, is a one-stop source of STI, including both selected, authoritative government websites and deep Web databases of technical reports, journal articles, conference proceedings, and other published materials. Through the volunteer efforts of members and involving over 100 staff, content and architecture is developed for the site. The Science.gov website is hosted by the Department of Energy (DOE) Office of Scientific and Technical Information (OSTI). The site was formally launched in December 2002. As a result of the success of Science.gov, under DOE leadership and in cooperation with the International Council of Scientific and Technical Information, a worldwide coordination across national portals called WorldWideScience was launched in 2008.

=== Work with non-member organizations ===
CENDI works with several cooperating non-member organizations on a regular basis. These agencies are in academia, federal government, legal and policy analysis, international, non-governmental, and private organizations.
