= Embase =

Biomedical and pharmacological database

- Producer: Elsevier (Netherlands)
- History: 1947–present

Access
- Cost: Subscription

Coverage
- Disciplines: Medicine
- Record depth: index
- Format coverage: journal articles
- Temporal coverage: 1947–present
- Geospatial coverage: Worldwide
- Update frequency: Daily

Print edition
- Print title: Excerpta Medica (EM) Abstract Journals

Links
- Website: elsevier.com/embase

Embase (often styled EMBASE for Excerpta Medica dataBASE) is a biomedical and pharmacological bibliographic database of published literature designed to support information managers and pharmacovigilance in complying with the regulatory requirements of a licensed drug. Embase, produced by Elsevier, contains over 32 million records from over 8,500 currently published journals from 1947 to the present. Through its international coverage, daily updates, and drug indexing with EMTREE, Embase enables tracking and retrieval of drug information in the published literature. Each record is fully indexed and Articles in Press are available for some records and In Process are available for all records, ahead of full indexing. Embase's international coverage expands across biomedical journals from 95 countries and is available through a number of database vendors.

== History ==
In 1946, the beginnings of Embase was created as Excerpta Medica (EM) Abstract Journals by a group of Dutch physicians who promoted the flow of medical knowledge and reports post World War II. Included in EM were 13 journal sections, which categorized the medical school curriculum by anatomy, pathology, physiology, internal medicine, and other basic clinical specialties. This database lasted until 1972, when it merged with Elsevier.

In 1972, EM had joined with Elsevier and later, in 1975, formed EMBASE (Excerpta Medica database) which had released electronic access to abstract journals. Following feedback from the EMBASE user community, EMBASE Classic was created as a separate database to supplement EMBASE as a backfile of medical journals from 1947 to 1973, which provides valuable documentation of drugs, adverse effects, endogenous compounds, etc. found at the time.

In 2010, Excerpta Medica, excluding EMBASE, was sold by Elsevier to the Omnicom Group.

== Current status ==
In addition to the 28 million reports, Embase's database steadily rises each year at a rate of over 900,000 records. This wide expanse of information is used in both professional and educational environments for retrieving any published biomedical or drug related information. Currently, Embase allows further customization for a personal experience such as implementing a RSS feed and email alert system. With new drug and disease-related information constantly released, Embase is updated daily to provide a comprehensive and reliable source of information.

== See also ==
- List of academic databases and search engines
- Index medicus
- MEDLINE
- Cochrane Library
