= NTRS =

NTRS may refer to:

- National Technology Roadmap for Semiconductors
- NASA Technical Reports Server
