= Gillian Weir (biomechanist) =

Biomechanist and researcher

- Citizenship: Australian
- Education: The University of Western Australia
- Awards: Hans Gros Emerging Researcher Award (2020)
- Scientific career
- Fields: Biomechanics, Kinesiology, Sport Science
- Workplaces: University of Massachusetts Amherst, The University of Western Australia, New York Yankees

Gillian Weir is an Australian biomechanist and researcher whose work focuses on injury prevention and sports performance biomechanics, particularly related to ACL injury risk in team sports. She has collaborated with professional athletic organizations in the United States and Australia.

== Career ==
Weir is currently a senior biomechanist with the New York Yankees, a position she has held since September 2020.

She previously worked at the University of Massachusetts Amherst in Professor Joe Hamill’s biomechanics laboratory in the Department of Kinesiology. She held a fellow position there from January to November 2015, and continued contributing to student mentorship, research, and undergraduate teaching.

Before her time in the U.S., Weir worked at the University of Western Australia in the Department of Biomechanics and Motor Control, Learning and Development. She held the position of research associate from March 2014 to November 2015.

In addition to her research and industry roles, Weir served as the Student Representative for the International Society of Biomechanics in Sports from 2016 to 2018, supporting student outreach and engagement within the society.

== Education ==
Weir completed her studies at The University of Western Australia between March 2007 and November 2010. She studied in the field of sport science, exercise and health, conducting research within the Department of Biomechanics and Motor Control, Learning and Development in Perth, Australia.

== Research ==
Weir's research investigates the biomechanical factors that contribute to lower-limb injuries in sports, with a focus on dynamic movement analysis. Her work often includes data from athletes in a range of professional sports including field hockey and soccer, applying motion capture and force plate technologies.

== Awards ==
In 2020, Weir was awarded the Hans Gros Emerging Researcher Award by the International Society of Biomechanics in Sports (ISBS), recognizing her as a promising early-career researcher. As part of the award, she was invited to deliver a keynote lecture at the ISBS annual conference in Liverpool, United Kingdom.

== Selected publications ==
- Weir, Gillian; van Emmerik, Richard; Jewell, Carl; Hamill, Joseph (January 2019). "Coordination and variability during anticipated and unanticipated sidestepping". Gait & Posture. 67: 1–8. doi:10.1016/j.gaitpost.2018.09.007. PMID 30245239.
- Weir, Gillian; Alderson, Jacqueline; Smailes, Natalie; Elliott, Bruce; Donnelly, Cyril (March 2019). "A Reliable Video-based ACL Injury Screening Tool for Female Team Sport Athletes". International Journal of Sports Medicine. 40 (3): 191–199. doi:10.1055/a-0756-9659. PMID 30630192.
- Donnelly, Cyril J.; Chinnasee, Chamnan; Weir, Gillian; Sasimontonkul, Siriporn; Alderson, Jacqueline (January 2017). "Joint dynamics of rear- and fore-foot unplanned sidestepping". Journal of Science and Medicine in Sport. 20 (1): 32–37. doi:10.1016/j.jsams.2016.06.002. PMID 27421650.
- Chinnasee, Chamnan; Weir, Gillian; Sasimontonkul, Siriporn; Alderson, Jacqueline; Donnelly, Cyril (July 2018). "A Biomechanical Comparison of Single-Leg Landing and Unplanned Sidestepping". International Journal of Sports Medicine. 39 (8): 636–645. doi:10.1055/a-0592-7422. PMID 29902807.
- Yates, Nathanael J.; Lydiard, Stephen; Fehily, Brooke; Weir, Gillian; Chin, Aaron; Bartlett, Carole A.; Alderson, Jacqueline; Fitzgerald, Melinda (July 2017). "Repeated mild traumatic brain injury in female rats increases lipid peroxidation in neurons". Experimental Brain Research. 235 (7): 2133–2149. doi:10.1007/s00221-017-4958-8. hdl:20.500.11937/56981. PMID 28417146.
- Devaprakash, Daniel; Weir, Gillian J.; Dunne, James J.; Alderson, Jacqueline A.; Donnelly, Cyril J. (December 2016). "The influence of digital filter type, amplitude normalisation method, and co-contraction algorithm on clinically relevant surface electromyography data during clinical movement assessments". Journal of Electromyography and Kinesiology. 31: 126–135. doi:10.1016/j.jelekin.2016.10.001. hdl:10072/405695. PMID 27810649.
- Weir, Gillian; Jewell, Carl; Wyatt, Hannah; Trudeau, Matthieu B.; Rohr, Eric; Brüggemann, Gert-Peter; Hamill, Joseph (2 January 2019). "The influence of prolonged running and footwear on lower extremity biomechanics". Footwear Science. 11 (1): 1–11. doi:10.1080/19424280.2018.1539127.
- Trudeau, Matthieu B.; Willwacher, Steffen; Weir, Gillian; Rohr, Eric; Ertel, Christopher; Bruggemann, Gert-Peter; Hamill, Joseph (2 September 2019). "A novel method for estimating an individual's deviation from their habitual motion path when running". Footwear Science. 11 (3): 135–145. doi:10.1080/19424280.2019.1615004.
- Rice, Hannah; Weir, Gillian; Trudeau, Matthieu B.; Meardon, Stacey; Derrick, Timothy; Hamill, Joseph (November 2019). "Estimating Tibial Stress throughout the Duration of a Treadmill Run". Medicine & Science in Sports & Exercise. 51 (11): 2257–2264. doi:10.1249/MSS.0000000000002039. hdl:10871/37071. PMID 31634292. CORE output ID 199254417.
