= Linguamatics =

- Type: Private company
- Industry: Software
- Founded: 9 July 2001; 25 years ago
- Headquarters: Cambridge, UK
- Revenue: ▲£9.1 million (2017)
- Number of employees: 94 (2017)
- Parent: IQVIA
- Website: www.linguamatics.com

Linguamatics, headquartered in Cambridge, England, with offices in the United States and UK, is a provider of text mining systems through software licensing and services, primarily for pharmaceutical and healthcare applications. Founded in 2001, the company was purchased by IQVIA in January 2019.

== Technology ==
The company develops enterprise search tools for the life sciences sector. The core natural language processing engine (I2E) uses a federated architecture to incorporate data from 3rd party resources. Initially developed to be used interactively through a graphic user interface, the core software also has an application programming interface that can be used to automate searches.

LabKey, Penn Medicine, Atrius Health and Mercy all use Linguamatics software to extract electronic health record data into data warehouses. Linguamatics software is used by 17 of the top 20 global pharmaceutical companies, the US Food and Drug Administration, as well as healthcare providers.

== Software community ==
The core software, "I2E", is used by a number of companies to either extend their own software or to publish their data.

Copyright Clearance Center uses I2E to produce searchable indexes of material that would otherwise be unsearchable due to copyright.

Thomson Reuters produces Cortellis Informatics Clinical Text Analytics, which depends on I2E to make clinical data accessible and searchable.

Pipeline Pilot can integrate I2E as part of a workflow.

ChemAxon can be used alongside I2E to allow named entity recognition of chemicals within unstructured data.

Data sources include MEDLINE, ClinicalTrials.gov, FDA Drug Labels, PubMed Central, and Patent Abstracts.

== See also ==
- List of academic databases and search engines
