= Alerting system =

Alerting system may refer to:

- Notification system, a combination of software and hardware that provides a means of delivering a message to a set of recipients
- A system that allows alert messaging, machine-to-person communication that is important or time sensitive
- Emergency communication system, any system organized for the primary purpose of supporting communication of emergency information
