= Lists of databases =

This is a list of lists of databases or databanks:

- List of academic databases and search engines
- List of biodiversity databases
- List of biological databases
- List of chemical databases
- List of databases for oncogenomic research
- List of Drosophila databases
- List of genealogy databases
- List of long non-coding RNA databases
- List of neuroscience databases
- List of online databases
- List of online music databases
- List of relational database management systems

== See also ==
- Data
- List of online database creator apps
