= LingBuzz =

Linguistics article repository

- Website type: Science
- Available in: English
- Owner: University of Tromsø
- Creator: Michal Starke
- Website: LingBuzz
- Commercial: No
- Current status: Online

LingBuzz is a repository of electronic preprints and other kinds of published and unpublished articles in the field of linguistics. LingBuzz was created and is maintained by Michal Starke, and is hosted by the University of Tromsø. While its functionality and resources are much more limited than those of similar repositories, its use has become customary as a vehicle for sharing new and old research, especially in generative grammar. Researchers also routinely provide links to LingBuzz-hosted versions of papers in their personal webpages. Much like what happens in the case of arXiv, albeit in a smaller scale, LingBuzz papers are often cited as such.

== See also ==
- List of academic databases and search engines
