= International Aging Research Portfolio =

Open-access research database

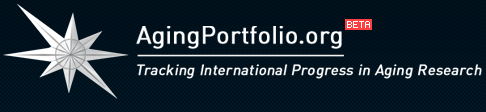

Content
- Description: Non-Profit Open Access Knowledge Management System for Aging Research

Contact
- Authors: Alex Zhavoronkov, Charles Cantor, Konstantin Romantsov, Eli Mohamad, Zeljka Smit-McBride, Olga Koborova, Anton Kolesov, Varvara Konova, Kirill Alyavdin, Pavel Polyakov, Chris Smelick, David Asprey, Dmitry Ivanov, Grigory Vaigandt, Russell Han, Jane Yang, Vasilisa Rudneva, Valeriya Kolesnikova
- Primary citation: PMID 21799912
- Release date: 24th of February 2011

Access
- Website: http://www.agingportfolio.org/

Miscellaneous
- License: Creative Commons Attribution License 3.0
- Version: beta

International Aging Research Portfolio (IARP) is a non-profit, open-access knowledge management system incorporating grants, publications, conferences in natural and social & behavioral sciences. In addition to the advanced search and visual trend analysis tools the system includes a directory of research projects classified into categories related to aging research. The system uses automatic classification algorithms with elements of machine learning to assign research projects to the relevant categories. The directory is curated by many expert category editors and science advisory board members. The chair of the science advisory board is Dr. Charles Cantor.

== Background ==
Aging research is a multidisciplinary field spanning many areas of natural and social and behavioral sciences and the research data is widely dispersed. Popular resources like PubMed and Google Scholar provide access to historic as well as most recent scientific abstracts and full text publications. However, few resources exist that incorporate international databases of the scientific publications, scientific grant abstracts and clinical trials databases.

Grant abstracts are usually published by the funding organizations and precede publications in peer-reviewed literature. Some of the experiments described in grant abstracts fail or do not result in peer-reviewed publications. To prevent redundancy and promote scientific cooperation it is important to browse through all available grant information worldwide to see if there are similar projects being funded.

The IARP database integrates information on research grants, peer-reviewed publications, and issued patent applications from multiple sources. Additionally, the database uses flexible project classification mechanisms and tools for analyzing project associations and trends. This system enables scientists to search the centralized project database, to classify and categorize aging projects, and to analyze the funding aspects across multiple research disciplines. The IARP is designed to provide improved allocation and prioritization of scarce research funding, to reduce project overlap and improve scientific collaboration thereby accelerating scientific and medical progress in a rapidly growing area of research.

The IARP system aggregates grant data from many sources including the US National Institutes of Health (NIH), European Commission (EC), Canadian Institutes of Health Research, US National Science Foundation, Australian National Health and Medical Health Council and publication abstract data through a license of MEDLINE database. The database is searchable and the results can be presented as charts and graphs for trends analysis. One of the main features of the IARP system is automatic and manual classification of the research projects into a structured directory. The IARP science advisory board and volunteer expert category editors classify the projects from the database into relevant categories. These manually classified projects become training sets for the automatic classification algorithms with elements of machine learning. The IARP system is highly modular and portable and may be used as a platform for developing other knowledge management systems for aging research.

== Content ==
The International Aging Research Portfolio (IARP) includes historic grant data from the National Institutes of Health(NIH), European Commission(EC), NSF, Canadian and Australian research councils and many other sources. It also contains MEDLINE article abstracts under a license from the National Library of Medicine. The IARP volunteer development team works directly with the publication offices and regularly updates the database either automatically or by parsing the data mailed on physical medium.

== Characteristics ==
=== Simple searches ===
Simple searches on IARP can be carried out by entering key aspects of a subject into search window.

IARP translates this initial search formulation and automatically adds field names, Boolean operators, and enhancing the search formulation significantly, in particular by routinely combining (using the OR operator) text words.

'Programmed Theory Aging'

is translated as

("Programmed" OR "Theory" OR "Aging")

=== Advanced searches ===
Advanced Project Search allows users to limit their search criteria, ranging from the date of creation and research and funding mechanism to specific projects. In addition to the description, each research project contains specific information about the funding organization, recipient organization and the Principal Investigator(s). Moreover, it links the current project with other similar projects and financial mechanisms.

To use the advanced search features effectively, the user must poses some knowledge of the research area and use relevant and specific keywords and limits. The form allows users to specify multiple values for accurate data retrieval.

[Keywords]. Users can use Boolean operators and Mask for finding information in project description and title fields.

Search query examples:

'nerv*'
'stem AND cell NOT embryonic'
'accumulation amyloid alzheimers'

[Research Areas]. Users can limit their searches by selecting desired research areas from the category tree.

[Theories Of Aging]. Users can select multiple values from a list of Theories Of Aging.

In addition, users can limit their search by:

Fiscal Years, Project Number, Principal Investigators, Project Start and End dates, Recipient and Funding Organizations, Funding type.

=== Trends and Tools ===
Trends Analysis Chart & Tools is a collection of tools for visualizing the project data as diagrams, charts and comparative tables. The interface allows users to create two-dimensional charts comparing research funding by year, institution, university, principal investigator, region and category.

=== Summary statistics ===
Representing a comprehensive analysis of data stored in the system (useful for understanding the content of the database by total number of projects). Displays the current state of the database is stored on publications and projects in detail : total, classified, classified manually, classified as aging, unclassified. Displays the top 50 active, completed projects by total funding, the top countries, US states, investigators, funding bodies and recipient organizations, also by total funding.

=== Other Tools ===
The system also incorporates tools like the Grant Matchmaker, Who is Who and Funding Organizations and Biotechnology Events and Webcasts that are currently in various stages of development. The intent of these tools is to provide the research community with the ability to identify organizations funding similar research projects, identify possible collaborators and find conference relevant to their research interests.

== Data Classification ==
=== Automatic Project Classification ===
Automatic project classification is used to identify projects related to aging research within the large data sets and to classify projects into relevant semantic groups. The system utilizes two classification algorithms with elements of machine learning: Support Vector Machine SVM and Recurrent-Neural-Network-Based Boolean Factor Analysis (BFA). Since 2014 the SVM algorithm was modified to facilitate for multilabel classification of incompletely-labelled data sets where few labels assigned by the IARP experts are present. This allowed for improved classification accuracy.

=== Manual Project Classification ===
As current automatic classification algorithms are limited and require each category to have relatively large training sets, the system relies heavily on manual classification by expert category editors. The SAB and Category Editor administrative interface enables SAB members, institute directors and laboratory heads to curate the top-level categories and delegate the management of lower-level categories to graduate students.

=== Linking Related Grants and Publications ===
IARP has the ability to automatically identify related and similar projects in database using an algorithm analysis of project abstracts, patents, and publications. This type of advanced project analysis will potentially aid in circumventing project overlap and redundant funding of similar programs while also highlighting knowledge gaps for potential funding.

== Other Resources Using IARP Database ==
The FundingTrends project allows for a simple keyword search of millions of biomedical projects supported by major research funding organizations worldwide. It then draws the amount of funding for each year for the projects containing the keywords.

The Aging.CC project allows for a simple keyword search of millions of biomedical projects supported by major research funding organizations worldwide.

== Reviews ==
- The International Aging Research Portfolio was reviewed by the editorial of the Genetic Engineering & Biotechnology News (GEN) and received a three star rating.

== See also ==
- List of academic databases and search engines
- Community Research & Development Information Service
- Computer Retrieval of Information on Scientific Projects
- Australian Research Council
- National Research Council (Canada)
