= Sparrho =

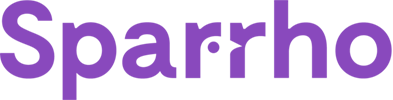
- Creators: Vivian Chan, Nilu Satharasinghe
- Website: www.sparrho.com
- Written in: Clojure

Sparrho combines human and artificial intelligence to help research professionals and layman users stay up-to-date with new scientific publications and patents. Sparrho's recommendation engine provides personalized scientific news-feeds by using proprietary machine learning algorithms to "aggregate, distill and recommend" relevant content. The platform aims to complement traditional methods of finding relevant academic material such as Google Scholar, and PubMed with a system which enables the serendipitous discovery of content and across relevant scientific fields.

== Recommendation engine ==
Sparrho uses a "three-pronged approach" to content recommendation. Firstly, "data-data analysis" is tackled using techniques such as natural language processing to provide appropriate research based on data provided by users. Secondly, "user-user interactions" are utilized to propose a wider range of potentially relevant subject areas to users with similar interests. Finally, "user-data interactions" such as labeling articles as "relevant" or "irrelevant" within a particular scientific field allows Sparrho to personalize user newsfeeds.

== History ==
Sparrho was founded in 2013 by Vivian Chan and Nilu Satharasinghe as a solution to issues Chan encountered over the course of her biochemistry PhD at the University of Cambridge, especially in staying up to date with scientific literature Initially established at Ideaspace in West Cambridge, and moving subsequently to Camden Collective and the Ministry of Startups in London, the company is now based in the data science hub SHACK15 in Shoreditch, London.

In 2014, Chan was a semi-finalist for the 2014 Duke of York New Entrepreneur of the Year Award, and in 2015, Chan was included on the 35 Women Under 35 list compiled by Management Today. In 2016, Sparrho was a semi-finalist in Pitch@Palace 5.0.

As of July 2017, Sparrho has raised $3 million from investors including White Cloud Capital, AllBright, and Beast Ventures.

== Competitors ==
Sparrho's primary competitors are PubChase and Scizzle, though both PubChase and Scizzle are targeted towards biomedical sciences and solely recommend academic journal papers.

== See also ==
- List of academic databases and search engines
