= International Bibliography of Humanism and the Renaissance =

- Producer: Brepols Publishers (since 2013); Librairie Droz (1965-2013)
- History: 1965-present
- Languages: English, French, German, Italian, Spanish

Access
- Providers: Brepols Publishers
- Cost: Subscription

Coverage
- Disciplines: Religious history, philosophy, science, art, military and political history, social and gender studies, and more
- Record depth: Index and abstract
- Temporal coverage: 16th and 17th centuries
- Geospatial coverage: Europe and the wider world
- No. of records: 355,000+ academic publications

Print edition
- Print title: Bibliographie internationale de l’Humanisme et de la Renaissance
- Print dates: 1965-present

Links
- Website: www.brepolis.net

The International Bibliography of Humanism and the Renaissance (IBHR) is a multidisciplinary bibliographic database covering European culture and history for the 16th and 17th centuries. Its geographical scope extends outside Europe by including publications on European interactions with the wider world. Chronologically, it extends beyond the Renaissance through the inclusion of modern hermeneutics and reception studies.

The database currently comprises over 355,000 records on every aspect of the Renaissance humanist period. Annually, about 20.000 records are added. Publications in English, French, German, Greek, Spanish, Italian, Portuguese, Hungarian, Romanian, Dutch, Polish, Russian, Swedish and Japanese are eligible for inclusion.

Between 1965 and 2013, the Bibliographie internationale de l’Humanisme et de la Renaissance was coordinated and published by Librairie Droz in Geneva, Switzerland. Brepols Publishers of Turnhout, Belgium, acquired the rights to the bibliography in 2013 and has since developed it into an online database.
