= HubMed =

Alternative interface for PubMed

HubMed is an alternative, third-party interface to PubMed, the database of biomedical literature produced by the National Library of Medicine. It transforms data from PubMed and integrates it with data from other sources. Features include relevance-ranked search results, direct citation export, tagging and graphical display of related articles.

== See also ==
- List of academic databases and search engines
