= Directorate-General for Employment, Social Affairs and Inclusion =

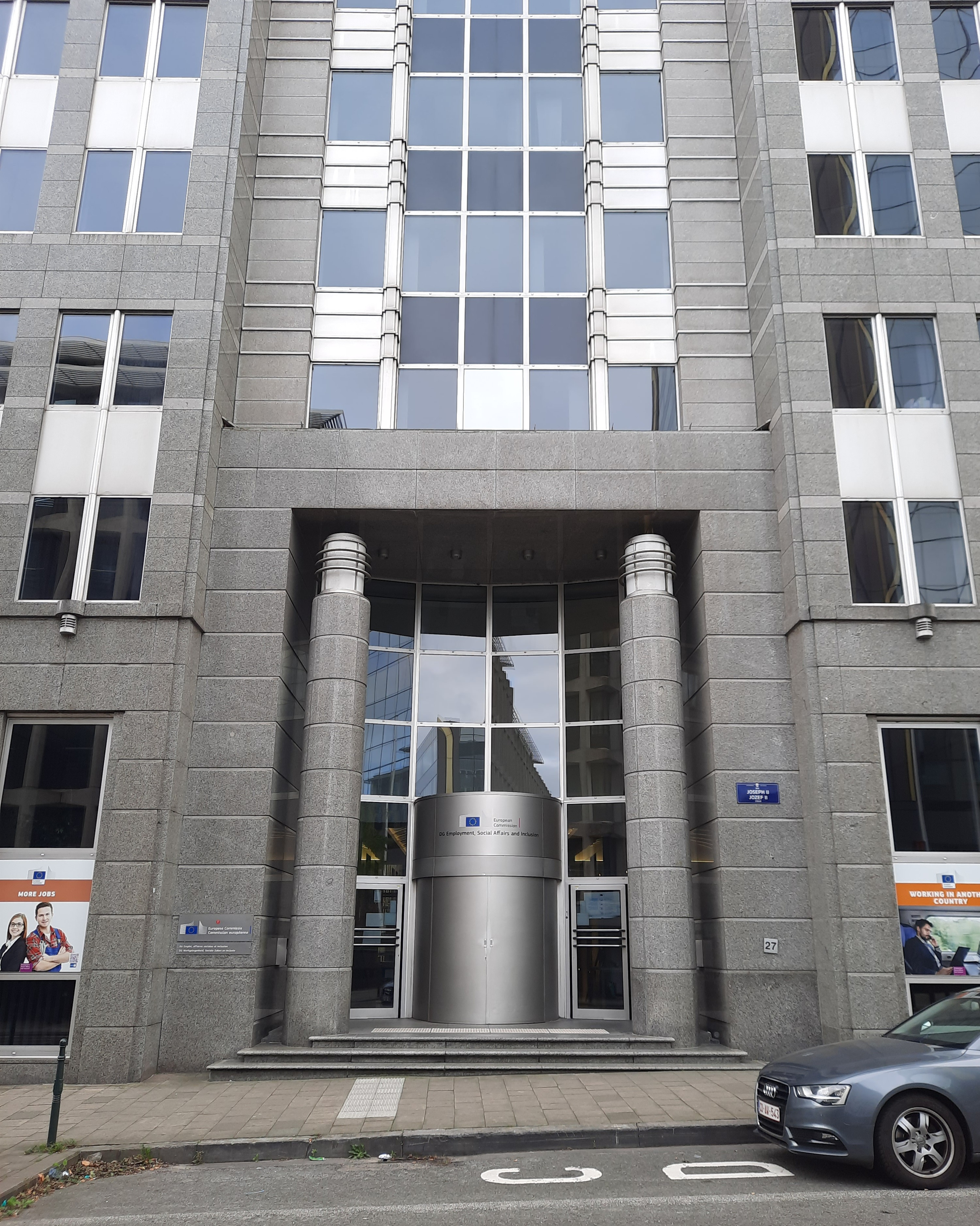
DG EMPL's previous offices in Rue Joseph II, Brussels

The Directorate-General for Employment, Social Affairs and Inclusion (DG EMPL) is a Directorate-General of the European Commission. It was formerly known as the Directorate-General for Employment, Social Affairs and Equal Opportunities.

The Directorate-General for Employment, Social Affairs and Inclusion has the task of contributing to the development of a modern, innovative and sustainable European social model with more and better jobs in an inclusive society based on equal opportunities.

== Structure ==
The Directorate-General is organised into 8 directorates:

- Directorate A: European Pillar of Social Rights and Strategy
- Directorate B: Jobs and Skills
- Directorate C: Working Conditions and Social Dialogue
- Directorate D: Social Rights and Inclusion
- Directorate E: Labour Mobility and International Affairs
- Directorate F: Employment and Social Governance & Analysis
- Directorate G: Funds Programming and Implementation
- DAC: Joint Audit Directorate for Cohesion

== Buying Social ==
DG EMPL commissioned a report published in 2010 entitled "Buying Social", which provided guidance on how to take "social considerations" into account within the EU and its Member States' public procurement processes. The guide provides a "non-exhaustive list" of potential social considerations which contracting authorities might refer to in their procurement processes, including employment opportunities for groups who struggle in the labour market, the "decent work" agenda and ethical trade. A second edition was published in 2021, updated to reflect changes in the legal context of public procurement following the adoption of the revised Directive on Public Procurement in 2014, and now adding references to green and circular public procurement. The Public Procurement Unit, GROW.C.2 within the Directorate-General for Internal Market, Industry, Entrepreneurship and SMEs, led on the revised publication.

== See also ==
- European Commissioner for Jobs and Social Rights
- European Agency for Safety and Health at Work (EU-OSHA)
- European Centre for the Development of Vocational Training
- European Training Foundation
