= MyScienceWork =

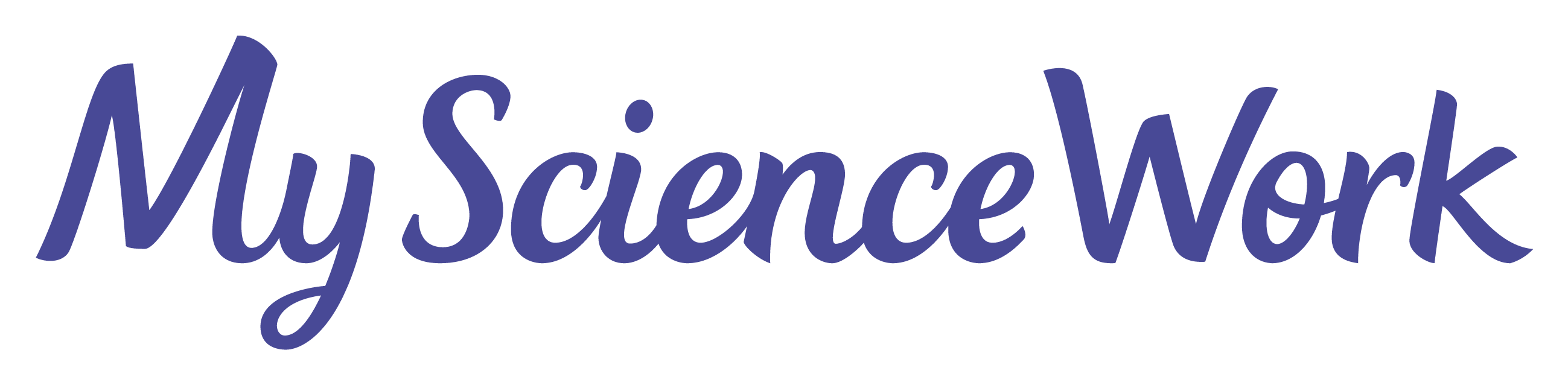
- Company type: Global Scientific Platform
- Available in: English, French, Chinese, Spanish, German, Italian, Portuguese, Russian
- Headquarters: San Francisco and Luxembourg
- Founders: Virginie Simon, Tristan Davaille
- Website: https://www.mysciencework.com
- Launched: 2010

MyScienceWork is a technology company that provides open source data management software for research institutions, scientific publishers and private-sector R&D companies. The company's main product is generally described as a social network for scientific researchers.

In parallel to its business activities, MyScienceWork offers a database hosting more than 90 million scientific publications and 12 million patents.

== MyScienceWork and open access ==
MyScienceWork supports the circulation of open access scientific texts. Its search engine centralizes the main open access databases online, like PubMed, CiteSeer, DOAJ, Research Papers in Economics, ArXiv, HAL, BioMed Central, CERN, Persee, Revues.org, ORBI, and Public Library of Science.

In 2012 and 2013, MyScienceWork was the national coordinator of International Open Access Week in France.

== Company history ==
- 2010 August: MyScienceWork is founded by Virginie Simon, a researcher in cancer nanotechnology, and Tristan Davaille, a financial engineer.
- 2013 January: The global platform www.MyScienceWork.com is online to provide access to scientific databases cataloguing research publications available online: Over 20 million are open access with a PDF download available and 10 million are priced for individual purchase from scientific publishers.
- 2014 October: First project centre outside France opens in San Francisco, America.
- 2014 December: The first repository platform for research information is released.
- 2018 April: MyScienceWork launches Polaris OS an advanced open source repository software to map, manage and measure institutional research.

== See also ==
- List of academic databases and search engines
