= Airiti =

Digital content provider in Taiwan

Airiti Incorporation
- Company type: Private company
- Industry: Information Technology & Service, Publishing, Database, Indexing
- Founded: 2000
- Headquarters: Taipei, Taiwan

Chinese name
- Traditional Chinese: 華藝數位
- Simplified Chinese: 华艺数位
Transcriptions
Standard Mandarin
- Hanyu Pinyin: Huáyì shùwèi
- Website: www.airiti.com/en/One-Page/index.html

Airiti Incorporation (Chinese: 華藝數位) headquartered in Taipei, Taiwan, is a Chinese e-content provider of Chinese academic e-journals, Taiwanese academic e-journals, classical art images to more than 450 libraries in 2006 and has extended to more than 72,000 libraries in 112 countries and territories around the world.

== History ==
Airiti Inc. established in 2000, started from Art Image Indexing Service on the Internet, and gradually developed into professional database of Art works and academic journals. The company has been providing solutions to the Mainland Chinese and Taiwanese academic communities by offering copyright consultation services, digital archive mechanisms, academic research analysis systems, and calibre academic publications. It is the only company in the world to provide Taiwanese academic e-journals.

In 2006, an alliance was formed with OCLC in providing Asian eContent to libraries worldwide. Product such as, Taiwan Electronic Periodical Services and National Palace Museum Online were project by Airiti supported and Named the Best Subsidized Digital Publication by the Executive Yuan.

== Products ==
- ABC (AiritiBooks.Com) An online ebooks platform servicing libraries with a collection of Chinese eBooks, in collaboration with publishers.
- ACI (Academic Citation Index) a Chinese Humanity citation index covering both Taiwan Humanities Citation Index and Taiwan Social Science Citation Index.
- ARTS (World Fine Arts Database) Collections of more than 70,000 art pieces from 900 artists from Taiwan, China, Japan and Western world.
- CEPS (Chinese Electronic Periodical Services) is one of the leading Chinese language collection of full-text periodicals in the global Chinese speaking language in the world.
- CETD (Chinese Electronic Theses & Dissertations Service) is the source of thesis and dissertations from major universities in the Asian region. They include National Taiwan University, Taiwan National Tsing Hua University, National Chung Hsing University, Tamkang University, Chung Yuan Christian University, Chung Sang Medical University, Taipei National University of Technology, Yuan Ze University, Kaohsiung Medical University, China Medical University, Taipei National University of the Arts, Chang Jung Christian University, Kaohsiung Hospitality College, National Chi Nana University, and National Taiwan Normal University, Hong Kong University.
- TEPS (Taiwan Electronic Periodical Services) is the largest and only collection of full-text Taiwanese periodicals in the world.
- National Palace Museum Online database is the world’s most complete and feature-rich eContent offering for world largest ancient Chinese art treasures museum.

== See also ==
- List of companies of Taiwan
- OCLC
- List of academic databases and search engines
