= Book Review Index =

Index of book reviews published by Gale

- Founded: 1965 to present
- Company: Gale
- Country: United States
- Based in: Detroit
- Website: gale.com/book-review-index
- ISSN: 0524-0581

Book Review Index is an index of book reviews and literary criticism, found in leading academic, popular, and professional periodicals. It has been published since 1965. For most of its history it has been owned by Gale and is based in Detroit.

== Publication history ==
Volume 1 of Book Review Index was published in 1965. It was originally published monthly. Starting in May 1977, the index was published bi-monthly. In 1994, the index became quarterly. Since 1996, it has been published three times a year, along with an annual accumulation.

In 1975, Gale began publishing Children's Book Review Index, which included information from Book Review Index on children's literature.

== Online ==
The entire index of more than 5.6 million reviews covering over 2.5 million titles is also available as Book Review Index Online or Book Review Index Plus with the full electronic text of more than 600,000 discussions.

== See also ==
- List of academic databases and search engines
- Academic Journal - Book reviews
- Book reviews
