= Zasshi Kiji Sakuin =

Japanese Periodicals Index database

Zasshi Kiji Sakuin (雑誌記事索引, "Japanese Periodicals Index"), often called Zassaku in short, is a searchable database of scholarly articles in Japanese. The database, produced by the National Diet Library (NDL) in 1948, catalogs selected articles from NDL's extensive collection of periodicals. The database was created for the purpose of facilitating scholastic research in providing citation information. Scholarly journals, specialized magazines, institutional periodical publications and general-interest magazines are included in the database from all areas of academic interest: humanities, social sciences, science and technology, and medical sciences, including pharmacology. Approximately 10,000 periodicals and more than 6,660,000 articles are currently registered in Zasshi Kiji Sakuin. It is updated every two weeks. Zasshi Kiji Sakuin's extensive coverage of periodicals provides an excellent bibliography of research and publications in Japan, which may not necessarily appear in non-Japanese journals of Japanese studies.

== Collection ==
=== Content of coverage ===
Besides its extensive collection of academic journals, the database has collected non-academic magazines and periodicals since 1996 to cater to the research needs of the general public. In 1996, the database added weekly magazines: サンデー毎日、週刊読売、週刊朝日、週刊現代、週刊文春、週刊新潮、週刊ポスト、週刊宝石、Aera、金曜日, which, according to a survey conducted by NDL, are, among other magazines, most frequently used by the public. The database also acquired corporate magazines, high school and community college publications, and other research-related magazines. From 1996 to 2000, the number of magazines included in the database had increased from 3100 to 9000 due to NDL's major expansion of its magazines and periodicals. A full list of periodicals entry, as well as the selection criteria for the periodicals and articles, are available in Japanese through NDL's official website. In addition to the Japanese periodicals, the database contains foreign periodicals published in Japan, as well as Japanese periodicals published outside Japan.

=== Period of coverage ===
Zasshi Kiji Sakuin covers articles published after 1975. The articles in humanities and social sciences include those published since 1948. NDL is currently working on indexing articles in science and technology, which were published between 1948 and 1974. The project will extend until the fiscal year of 2007, but the citations are gradually becoming available in the database.

== Access ==
=== OPAC ===
Produced by the National Diet Library, Zasshi Kiji Sakuin is free of charge and can be accessed through NDL's Online Public Access Catalog (OPAC), under "Search for Japanese Periodicals Index" on the English page and 雑誌記事索引の検索/申込み on the Japanese page. The OPAC is available both in Japanese and in English, and words can also be entered both in Japanese and in Romaji. Article information can be searched by article title, author name, journal title, and publisher's name. In-text keyword search is not available. The OPAC's hours of operation (Japan time) are Monday through Saturday from 7 am to 5:30 am and Sunday from 7 am to 1 am, except the 3rd Sunday when it closes at 10 pm.

=== Magazine Plus ===
Zasshi Kiji Sakuin database is also available through Nichigai Associates via Magazine Plus. Magazine Plus is Japan's largest database of periodicals and academic articles. Besides containing the entire database of Zasshi Kiji Sakuin, Magazine Plus includes other databases of festschrifts (1945-2003), symposia & speeches (1945-2003), bulletins, transactions, proceedings (1945-2002), popular magazines (1981- ) and others. Magazine Plus is not free of charge and thus requires membership to access the database. The database is available only in Japanese.

=== CiNii ===
Zasshi Kiji Sakuin can also be accessed through National Institute of Informatics (NII, formerly NACSIS) via Citation Information service (CiNii). As part of the larger function of GeNii, CiNii contains various academic databases including Zasshi Kiji Sakuin. Out of 9,100,000 articles registered in the database, approximately 210,0000 are available in full text with or without a fee. Except for viewing some of the electronic texts, CiNii is free of charge and is available both in Japanese and in English.

== See also ==
- List of academic databases and search engines
