= Ei Compendex =

Database of citations about engineering

- Producer: Elsevier
- History: 1884-present

Coverage
- Disciplines: Engineering
- No. of records: 10,000,000

Print edition
- Print title: Engineering Index
- ISSN: 0742-1974

Links
- Website: elsevier.com/solutions/engineering-village/content/compendex
- Title list(s): elsevier.com/__data/assets/excel_doc/0006/251196/Compendex-source-list_02272015.xlsx

Ei Compendex is an engineering bibliographic database published by Elsevier. The name "Compendex" stands for COMPuterized ENgineering inDEX. It covers scientific literature pertaining to engineering materials. It started in 1884 under the name Engineering Index (Ei) and its first electronic bulletin was issued in 1967. Elsevier purchased the parent company Engineering Information in 1998.

== Coverage ==
Ei Compendex currently contains over 20 million records as of December 2020 and references over 5,000 international sources including journals, conferences and trade publications. Approximately 1,000,000 new records are added to the database annually from over 190 disciplines within the engineering field. Coverage is updated every week and covers the years 1970 to the present.

Coverage of engineering subjects include nuclear technology, bioengineering, transportation, chemical and process engineering, light and optical technology, agricultural engineering and food technology, computers and data processing, applied physics, electronics and communications, control, civil, mechanical, materials, petroleum, aerospace engineering, and automotive engineering as well as multiple subtopics within all those and other major engineering fields.

== See also ==
- List of academic databases and search engines
