= Readers' Guide to Periodical Literature =

Reference guide

- Producer: H. W. Wilson (United States)
- History: 1901 to present

Access
- Cost: Subscription

Coverage
- Format coverage: trade & magazine articles
- Temporal coverage: 1890 to present

Print edition
- ISSN: 0034-0464

Links
- Website: www.ebsco.com/products/research-databases/readers-guide-periodical-literature
- Title list(s): www.ebscohost.com/titleLists/rgl-coverage.htm

The Readers' Guide to Periodical Literature is a reference guide to recently published articles in periodical magazines and scholarly journals, organized by article subject. The Readers' Guide has been published regularly since 1901 by the H. W. Wilson Company, and is a staple of public and academic reference libraries throughout the United States.

Originally, The Readers' Guide was published biweekly, with later issues incorporating the previous content in larger copies until the index for the entire year was published.

H. W. Wilson Company offers two online database versions: Readers' Guide to Periodical Literature, which covers 1983 to the present, and Readers' Guide Retrospective: 1890–1982.

== See also ==
- List of academic databases and search engines
