= Vivian Chan =

British and Australian businesswoman

- Born: Hong Kong
- Citizenship: Australian, British
- Education: Trinity Lutheran College; University of Queensland; University of Cambridge
- Occupations: Founder of Deeptech Insider Board of Trustee of Create London Co-founder & former CEO of Sparrow (formerly Sparrho)

Dr. Vivian Chan is a British-Australian serial entrepreneur and businesswoman. She is the co-founder and former CEO of Sparrow (formerly Sparrho), a London-based startup making science accessible by blending AI and expert human curation to democratise science. Currently, she is the founder of Deeptech Insider, a platform providing exclusive insights, strategies, and access in the Deeptech sector (AI, Biotech/Healthtech, Aerospace, etc). Dr Chan also sits on the board for a charity that helps artists connect more closely with communities.

== Early life ==
Born in Hong Kong, Chan's family moved to Australia at a young age. She grew up going back and forth between Hong Kong and Australia, eventually settling in Australia's Gold Coast. Her parents worked in education and her grandparents in publishing.

== Education ==
Chan attended Trinity Lutheran College and went on to study biotechnology at the University of Queensland (UQ), achieving a BBiotech (First-Class Honours) in Drug Design and Development. After spending time at UQ as an Investment Process Manager in life sciences for the venture fund Uniseed, she received a Cambridge Commonwealth scholarship to study for a PhD in protein crystallography at the University of Cambridge. Whilst at Cambridge, she was voted into the role of president of the Cambridge University Technology & Enterprise Club (CUTEC) from 2010-2011. Chan was still in this role when she was approached by Alice Bentinck and Matthew Clifford of Entrepreneur First, who were seeking to recruit 30 graduates with entrepreneurship ambition. Chan had recently completed her PhD and was a member of the EF student advisory board, so decided to apply "at the last minute" and was selected to take part in EF's first cohort in 2012-13. She was one of three PhDs in her cohort, one of three females, and the only female PhD. Here, she met Nilu Satharasinghe, an experienced startup founder with a background in machine learning and a MSc in computer science from the University of Oxford.

== Sparrow (formerly Sparrho) ==
Chan and Satharasinghe founded Sparrho in 2013 as a solution to issues in staying up to date with scientific literature encountered over the course of Chan's biochemistry PhD. Inspiration for Sparrow came from Steve, a postdoctoral researcher in Chan's research lab who would read several key journals and bring paper recommendations to Chan's research group every morning. When Chan described this problem to Satharasinghe, he suggested 'digitising Steve'. This idea grew into the creation of Sparrow, Sparrho is also a digital subscription platform that makes science accessible to the 97% of the world who can't understand it. Powered by PhD scientists and AI, Sparrho translates critical issues like mental health and climate change into bite-sized summaries. The subscription-based service offers unlimited access to evidence-based summaries and a network of experts, delivered directly to your inbox or streamed online. Sparrow´s machine learning platform searches amongst over 60 million scientific works, the equivalent of over 80% of all current scientific literature.

== Honours and awards ==
In 2019, The Guardian named Chan as one of "Ten people under 35 who are changing the world for the better".

In November 2018, Chan was named to the Financial Times' list of the 'Top 100 minority ethnic leaders in technology.'

In 2017, Chan was selected by MIT Technology Review as one of its 35 Innovators Under 35. Executive director of HAG Consulting & Ventures and Startup Grind and jury member for Innovators Under 35 Europe 2017, Rodrigo de Alvarenga, commented that Chan's project "focuses on broadening and levelling out the access to scientific research to anyone interested and, in so doing, democratizing science and innovation through availability."

In 2014, she was selected as a semifinalist for The Duke of York (UK) New Entrepreneur of the Year.

In 2016, she was named one of the Top 5 Women within the Top 100 Asian Stars in UK Tech.

In 2015, she was named one of Management Today's 35 Women Under 35.

Chan has twice been invited to address EU ministers about the importance of open data for innovation, in 2015 and 2016.

She has been invited to No. 10 Downing Street multiple times, and sits on the Department for Digital, Culture, Media and Sport's Digital Economy Advisory Group alongside Matt Hancock, Minister of State for Digital.

In 2026, Chan received the International Alumni Award from the University of Queensland.
