= Socolar =

Free searchable database of open access journals

- Producer: China Educational Publications Import and Export Corporation(CEPIEC) (China)

Access
- Cost: Free

Coverage
- Disciplines: Scholarly open access resources in different language internationally
- Record depth: Journal title, journal publisher, journal homepage link, subject category, ISSN
- Format coverage: Journals
- Geospatial coverage: Worldwide
- No. of records: 11739 titles, 1048 repositories and 23795416 total articles (as of 12 December 2011)

Links
- Website: English

Socolar is a free searchable database of open access journals, and repositories hosted by the China Educational Publications Import and Export Corporation (CEPIEC), one of the largest state-owned companies that was established in 1987 to meet the demands of foreign academic publications from universities and colleges in China. It links to more than 11,739 journals and more than 1048 repositories with about 23,795,416 articles in total in many languages.

== See also ==
- List of academic databases and search engines
