= SemOpenAlex =

Knowledge graph for scholarly metadata

SemOpenAlex is an open knowledge graph for scholarly metadata. It is derived from the bibliographic database OpenAlex and represents scholarly entities and relations in the Resource Description Framework (RDF).

According to its original publication, SemOpenAlex contains more than 26 billion RDF triples about scholarly works and related entities, including authors, institutions, venues, concepts and publishers. It is released under the CC0 licence and is provided through RDF dumps, a SPARQL endpoint, dereferenceable URIs and links to other datasets in the Linked Open Data cloud.

SemOpenAlex has been discussed and reused in research on scholarly knowledge graphs and question answering. Erten et al. studied the SemOpenAlex concept hierarchy and proposed a method for refining noisy SKOS relations in its concept ontology. It has also been used as a structured data source in scholarly question-answering research and in the Scholarly QALD task at ISWC 2024.

== See also ==
- OpenAlex
- Semantic Web
- Linked data
- Bibliographic database
- Knowledge graph
