= Air University Library Index to Military Periodicals =

The Air University Library Index to Military Periodicals (AULIMP) was created in 1949 as a research tool for students and faculty of Air University. Twenty-three journals were included in the original AULIMP (then called the Air University Periodical Index), which was compiled quarterly as a way to provide access to journals not readily accessible in other commercial indexes. In 1963 the index was renamed to the Air University Library Index to Military Periodicals and over the years expanded its coverage to more than 80 periodicals. As of 2018, 63 titles are indexed. The AULIMP focuses on military, geopolitical and aeronautical topics, and includes over a dozen English language journals published outside the United States. Articles, interviews, book reviews, and speeches from high-ranking Department of Defense and Air Force officials are included in the AULIMP. AULIMP is the only free resource available in this subject area. Librarian subject specialists from the Muir S. Fairchild Research Information Center (formerly Air University Library), as well as librarians working off site through a cooperative program, index the journals included in the AULIMP.

== Coverage ==
The AULIMP was published from 1949–1999 and during the 1990s was available in a CD format to libraries. It is now strictly an electronic resource. Electronic access to the AULIMP is currently (as of 2018) available from 1987 to present. An ongoing retrospective project is underway to provide electronic access to the pre-1987 versions of the AULIMP.

== Access to AULIMP ==
The AULIMP can be accessed by the general public through the Muir S. Fairchild Research Information Center catalog. The index can be searched using both basic and advanced search interfaces with the option to search by author, title, journal title, keyword, and subject heading. Boolean search tools ("and", "or", and "not") are also available to further refine the search results. In addition, scans of pre-1987 issues can be found in the HathiTrust catalog and Internet Archive holdings.

== See also ==
- List of academic databases and search engines
