= Lesson Planet =

American education company

Education Planet, Inc.
- Company type: Privately held
- Website type: Online education
- Available in: English
- Founded: 1999
- Headquarters: Santa Barbara, California, U.S.
- Area served: Worldwide
- Founders: James Hurley, President & CEO
- Industry: Education
- Revenue: N/A
- Website: www.lessonplanet.com

Education Planet dba Lesson Planet, is a for-profit education company based in Santa Barbara, California. Lesson Planet provides teacher-reviewed resources for use by teachers and parents. Its products are designed to supplement traditional and non-traditional education from kindergarten through the 12th grade. The firm was founded in 1999 by James Hurley, and is based in Santa Barbara, California.

The Lesson Planet division of the firm consists of an education-focused website and search engine, providing links to teacher-reviewed resources that include lesson plans, worksheets, presentations, education-articles and education videos. The reviews are prepared by the firm's staff of certified classroom teachers. The website is searchable by grade and subject.

The site offers both paid and free digital content to educators. Current partners providing content include Virtual Nerd and other digital content providers.

== Teacher Content Management System ==
Lesson Planet's architecture makes it easy for teachers to find teacher-reviewed, online classroom-oriented resources. The Teacher Content Management System lets teachers find reviews for lesson plans, worksheets, educational videos, PowerPoint presentations and education articles.

== Awards ==
Education Planet was named 2012 Codie award finalist for " Best Education Reference Solution" and won a 2007 Technology & Learning Award of Excellence for "Teacher Resources." District Administration Magazine
