= Jurn =

Search tool for full-text scholarly works

Jurn is a free online search tool for the finding and downloading of free full-text scholarly works. It was established by David Haden in a public online open beta version in February 2009, initially for finding open access electronic journal articles in the arts and humanities. An additional public directory of web links to the indexed journals was placed online in mid 2009. The Jurn search service and directory has since been continually updated and cleaned. In March 2014 Jurn expanded to index topics in science, biomedicine, business and economics, plus selected university repository services for open access deposit papers and full-text theses. Jurn is powered by a Google Custom Search Engine (CSE) and is run without any adverts.

LiLi Li of Georgia Southern University described Jurn as a "recognised academic search engine" in his 2014 book Scholarly Information Discovery in the Networked Academic Learning Environment, and included a paragraph describing the Jurn service. Jurn also has a descriptive entry in Marcus P. Zillman's annotated White Paper "Academic and Scholar Search Engines and Sources". In 2015 University of Maryland librarian Matthew Testa tested JURN alongside Google Scholar and he concluded that... "JURN can be an effective way to find OA [open access] content from a variety of sources".

At 2016 Jurn is web linked by a number of academic and government libraries, including the Central Library of the European Commission, Jesus College, University of Cambridge, University of California and Princeton University Library.

GRAFT (Global Repository Access Full-Text), powered by a Google Custom Search Engine (CSE), searches across full-text and records alike, in 4,765 repositories.

== See also ==
- List of academic databases and search engines
