= CORE (research service) =

UK research service in The Open University

CORE (Connecting Repositories)
- Commercial?: No
- Type of project: Open Access, Repositories, Harvesting
- Location: Open University
- Country: United Kingdom
- Key people: Petr Knoth
- Website: core.ac.uk

CORE (Connecting Repositories) is a global open access indexing service developed at the Knowledge Media Institute (KMi) of The Open University, United Kingdom. It indexes metadata and full text content from institutional and subject repositories, as well as open access and hybrid journals, to provide access to scholarly works.

== Mission ==
CORE aims to support the open access movement in scholarly communication by improving the discoverability, accessibility, and reuse of research outputs at scale. The service underpins applications in a wide variety of areas including in systematic reviews, open access compliance monitoring, reproducibility of research software, training of LLMs, and analytics for funders and institutions. As of August 2025, CORE indexes over 400 million scholarly resources from repositories globally.

== Service description ==
There are existing commercial academic search systems, such as Google Scholar, which provide search and access level services, but do not support programmable machine access to the content. This is seen with the use of an API or data dumps, and limits the further reuse of the open access content (e.g., text and data mining). There are three access levels to content:

- access at the granularity of papers
- analytical access and granularity of collections
- programmable machine access to data

The programmable machine access is the main feature that distinguishes CORE from Google Scholar and formerly Microsoft Academic Search.

== History ==
The first version of CORE was created in 2011 by Petr Knoth with the aim to make it easier to access and text mine very large amounts of research publications. The value of the aggregation was first demonstrated by developing a content recommendation system for research papers, following the ideas of literature-based discovery introduced by Don R. Swanson. Since its start, CORE has received financial support from a range of funders including Jisc and the European Commission. CORE aggregates from across the world; in 2017, it was calculated that it reached documents from 102 countries in 52 languages. It has the status of the UK's national aggregator of open access content, aggregating metadata and full-text outputs from both UK publishers' databases as well as institutional and subject repositories.

CORE operates as a one step search tool for UK's open access research outputs, facilitating discoverability, use and reuse. The importance of the service has been widely recognised by Jisc, which suggested that CORE should preserve the required resources to sustain its operation and explore an international sustainability model. CORE is now one of the Repository Shared Services projects, along with Sherpa Services, IRUS, Jisc Publications Router and OpenDOAR.

In 2018, CORE said it was the world's largest aggregator of open access research papers. Based on the open access fundamental principles, as they were described in the Budapest Open Access Initiative, its open access content not only must be openly available to download and read, but it must also allow its reuse, both by humans and machines. As a result, there was a need to exploit the content reuse, which could be made possible with the implementation of a technical infrastructure. The CORE project started with the goal of connecting metadata and full-text outputs offering, through content aggregation, value-added services, and by opening new opportunities in the research process.

As of November 2025, CORE provided access to 431 million metadata records of scholarly papers, with an estimated 323M free to read full text links and 46M full texts hosted directly by CORE.

CORE makes its data available freely over the CORE API to everyone, including unauthenticated users. Higher rate limits are available to academics from CORE member institutions and paying users. CORE does not claim ownership of any individual metadata record or underlying work received from third-party repositories. In 2025, CORE announced that it is reviewing its data-licensing framework. Future versions of CORE will distinguish between factual metadata, which will be made openly reusable under a suitable licence, such as CC0 or ODC-0, and expressive content (e.g. abstracts or full texts), which will be made available under conditional access for lawful text- and data-mining purposes.

== Programmable access to CORE data ==
CORE data can be accessed through an API or downloaded as a pre-processed and semantically enriched data dump.

== Searching CORE ==
CORE provides searchable access to a collection of over 125 million open access harvested research outputs. All outputs can be accessed and downloaded free of cost and have limited re-use restrictions. One can search the CORE content using a faceted search. CORE also provides a cross-repository content recommendation system based on full-texts. The collection of the harvested outputs is available either by looking at the latest additions or by browsing the collection at the date of harvesting. The CORE search engine was selected by an author on Jisc in 2013 as one of the top 10 search engines for open access research, facilitating access to academic papers.

== Analytical use of CORE data ==
The availability of data aggregated and enriched by CORE provides opportunities for the development of new analytical services for research literature. These can be used, for example, to monitor growth and trends in research, validate compliance with open access mandates and to develop new automatic metrics for evaluating research excellence.

According to the Registry of Open Access Repositories, the number of funders increased from 22 units in 2007 to 34 in 2010 and then to 67 in 2015, while the number of institutional full-text and open access mandates picked up from 137 units in 2007 to 430 in 2015.

== Applications ==
CORE offers eight applications:

- CORE API, provides an access point to develop applications making use of CORE's collection of Open Access content.
- CORE Dataset, provides access to the data aggregated from repositories by CORE and allows their further manipulation.
- CORE Recommender, can link an institutional repository with the CORE service and recommends semantically related resources.
- CORE Repository Dashboard, is a tool for repository managers or research output administrators. The aim of the Repository Dashboard is to provide control over the aggregated content and help in the management and validation of the repository collections and services. It is integrated in the Institutional Repository Usage Statistics (IRUS-UK), a Jisc-funded project that serves as a national repository usage statistics aggregation servire.
- CORE Analytics Dashboard, helps institutions to understand and monitor the impact of their research.
- CORE Search, enables users to search and access research papers.
- CORE Publisher Connector, provides access to Gold and Hybrid Gold Open Access articles aggregated from non-standard systems of major publishers. Data is exposed via the ResourceSync protocol.
- CORE SDKs, provide access to content for programs. The CORE SDK R is freely available and it is mainly community led. The aim is to maximise the productivity and data analysis, prototyping and migration.

== See also ==
- List of academic databases and search engines
- BASE (search engine)
- Directory of Open Access Journals
- Open Access Button
- Paperity
