= Europass =

European Union qualification mobility scheme

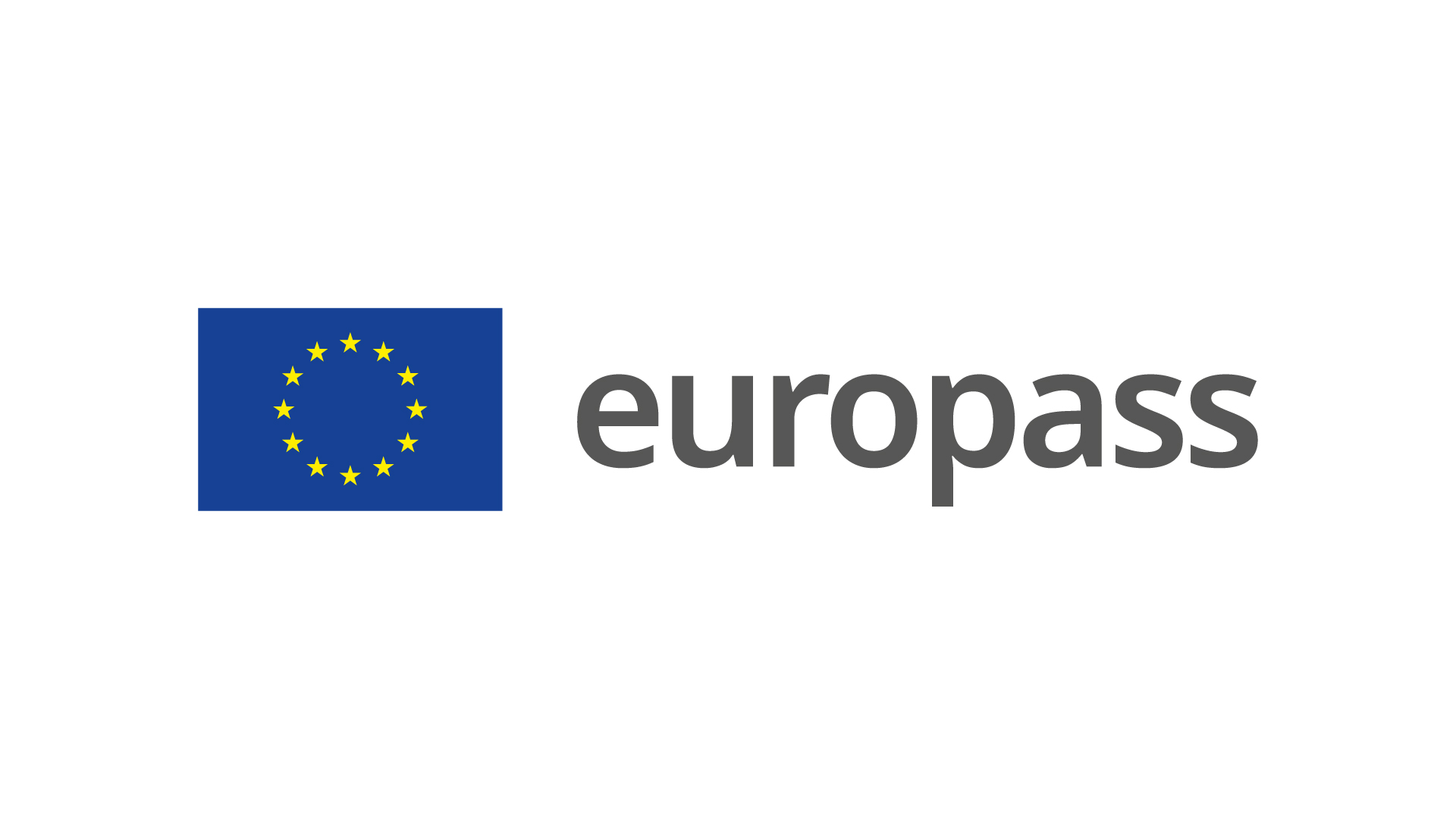
Official logo since 2020

Europass is a European Union (Directorate General for Employment, Social Affairs and Inclusion) initiative to increase transparency of qualifications and mobility of citizens in Europe. It aims to make a person's skills and qualifications clearly understood throughout Europe (including the European Union, European Economic Area and EU candidate countries).

The Europass platform offers digital tools and services such as the Europass profile, Curriculum Vitae (CV) builder, Cover Letter editor, Digital skill self assessment tool, the European Digital Credentials for learning, the job and skill trends tool as well as information related learning and working in Europe, Europass Mobility, Certificate Supplement, and Diploma Supplement, sharing a common brand name and logo. Since 2012 individuals have been able to assemble all Europass documents in the European Skills Passport. In July 2020, the new Europass platform was launched where users can register and create their Europass account, a personal and secure online space to record all their skills, qualifications, achievements and experiences. This platform aims to be a lifelong learning and career management tool for its users.

== Europass web portal ==
The Directorate General for Employment, Social Affairs and Inclusion (DG EMPL) developed and maintains the Europass portal in 30 languages. The portal is the reference resource of information related to working and learning in Europe. Europass is a free set of online tools to manage one's skills, and plan their learning and career in Europe.

In every country, a National Europass Centre promotes and provides Europass tools and services.

== Europass technical resources ==
=== Europass XML schema ===
Europass has produced an XML vocabulary to describe the information contained in the CV and Language Passport. A Europass CV or Language Passport can be saved in Europass XML format or PDF format with the XML attached. Both formats can be imported into the Europass online editors or any other system that understands the Europass XML, ensuring that all information is properly parsed.

=== Web services ===
Europass Web services provide a standard way (web API) for other systems, software, and services to use Europass services in an automated way. An example is the web service which enables the remote generation of Europass documents in PDF, OpenDocument, or Microsoft Word formats, starting from a Europass XML file.

=== Labels and help texts ===
Text labels used for the Europass CV and ELP (European Language Passport) are available in various formats from the Europass website:

- The OASIS XLIFF (XML Localisation Interchange File Format)
- The W3C XForms
- The PO file format is used in the GNU Gettext toolset

=== Weblog plug-in ===
The Directorate General for Education and Culture has co-financed the European project "KITE" under the Leonardo da Vinci programme. KITE offers an implementation of the Europass-CV as a plug-in for the open-source software weblogs WordPress and Dotclear. The plugin allow users of those blogging services to store a Europass CV in all European official languages and export it into the following formats: PDF, ODT, HTML, XHTML, HR-XML. The plugin is compliant with HR-XML SEP specifications. Last version of the plugin was released in January 2008.

== History ==
The Europass framework was established by Decision 2241/2004/EC of the European Parliament and of the Council of 15 December 2004 on a single Community framework for the transparency of qualifications and competences (Europass) and entered into force on 1 January 2005 by its own terms.
