= LabKey Server =

Software suite

- Developer: LabKey
- Written in: Java
- Operating system: Cross-platform
- License: Apache License 2.0
- Website: www.labkey.com

LabKey Server is a software suite available for scientists to integrate, analyze, and share biomedical research data.

== History ==
LabKey Server, originally known as the Computational Proteomics Analysis System (CPAS), was developed at the Fred Hutchinson Cancer Research Center to manage high volumes of data generated at the Fred Hutch Computational Proteomics Lab. In 2005, a small team spun out of the Hutch and began operating independently as LabKey Software after contributors realized that the software could be beneficial to the broader scientific community.

== Zika Open Research Portal ==
In 2016, LabKey and Professor Dave O'Connor of the University of Wisconsin–Madison launched the Zika Open Research Portal using LabKey Server. The portal provides direct access to experiment data being produced by members of the Zika Experimental Science Team (ZEST). The portal received attention from the scientific community.
