= WorldWideScience =

Science and research results search engine

WorldWideScience.org
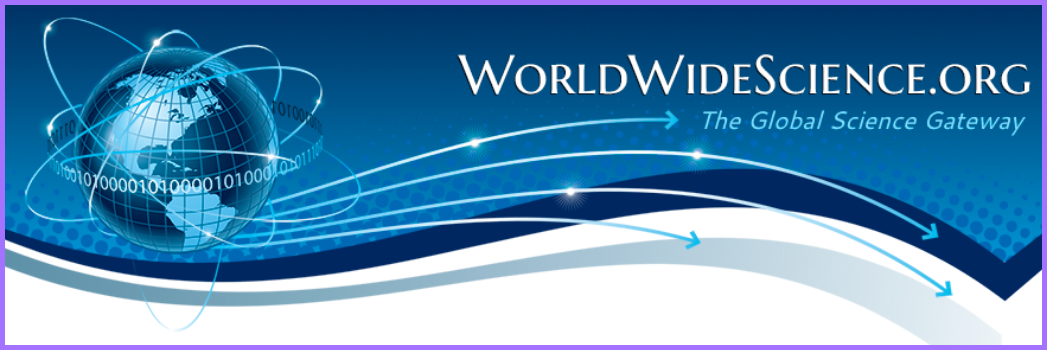
- Screenshot from the Homepage of WorldWideScience.org
- Producer: (U.S. Department of Energy's Office of Scientific and Technical Information)
- Languages: Multilingual

Access
- Cost: Partial free (login required for some activities)

Coverage
- Disciplines: Multi-discipline
- Geospatial coverage: Worldwide

Links
- Website: worldwidescience.org

WorldWideScience.org was a global science search engine (Academic databases and search engines) designed to accelerate scientific discovery and progress by accelerating the sharing of scientific knowledge. Through a multilateral partnership, WorldWideScience.org enables anyone with internet access to launch a single-query search of national scientific databases and portals in more than 70 countries, covering all of the world's inhabited continents and over three-quarters of the world's population. From a user's perspective, WorldWideScience.org makes the databases act as if they were a unified whole.

WorldWideScience.org implements federated searching to provide its coverage of global science and research results. Federated searching technology allows the information patron to search multiple data sources with a single query in real time. It provides simultaneous access to "deep web" scientific databases, which are typically not searchable by commercial search engines.

In June 2010, WorldWideScience.org implemented multilingual translations capabilities. Using Microsoft's Bing Translator, Multilingual WorldWideScience.org offers the user the ability to search across databases in ten languages and then have the results translated into their preferred language. "One to many" and "many to one" machine translations can be performed for Arabic, Chinese, English, French, German, Japanese, Korean, Portuguese, Russian, and Spanish.

The WorldWideScience.org website was retired on September 30, 2024.

== Features and abilities ==
WorldWideScience.org provides science search through a variety of features and abilities, including:

- Clustering of results by subtopics or dates to help users target their search
- Wikipedia results related to user search terms
- Eureka Science News results related to user search terms
- Mark and send option for emailing results to friends and colleagues
- Enhanced information related to the user's real-time search
- Alerts service
- Multilingual Translations

== History ==
The concept of a global gateway to national science information sources was first described by Dr. Walter Warnick at the International Council for Scientific and Technical Information (ICSTI) annual meeting in Washington, DC, in 2006. The concept was formalized in January 2007 when the British Library and the United States Department of Energy signed a Statement of Intent to partner in the development of a global science gateway. Later officially named "WorldWideScience.org", the gateway was developed by the U.S. Department of Energy's Office of Scientific and Technical Information. The system was unveiled to ICSTI members and the public at the June 2007 ICSTI meeting in Nancy, France.

Since its release in June 2007, WorldWideScience.org has enjoyed tremendous growth in both the number of data sources searched, along with the number of countries participating as information providers. The default search of WorldWideScience.org includes a search of the US contribution, Science.gov, which tends to return scholarly information as opposed to lay information. A transition from bilateral management to a multilateral governance structure, called the WorldWideScience Alliance, occurred in 2008. A formal launch of the Alliance took place at the June 2008 ICSTI meeting in Seoul, Korea. In June 2010, the multilingual translations feature was launched at the ICSTI meeting in Helsinki, Finland. Multimedia searching capabilities were added in 2011, allowing the user to search speech-indexed scientific multimedia made available through the ScienceCinema site. A mobile version of WorldWideScience.org was also released in 2011.

== Membership ==
The WorldWideScience Alliance has an international membership, including CISTI (Canada), ISTIC (China), VTT (Finland), INIST (France), INASP, International Nuclear Information System (INIS), TIB (Germany), JST (Japan), KISTI (Korea), Health Service Executive (HSE) (Ireland), SciELO (Argentina, Brazil, Chile, Colombia, Cuba, Mexico, Portugal, Spain, Venezuela), CSIR (South Africa), British Library, Science.gov (United States), African Journals OnLine, and ICSTI.
