= Science.gov =

US government web portal and search engine

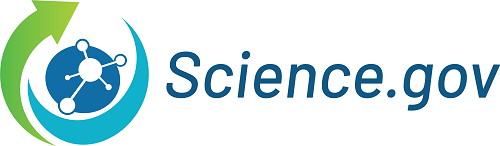
- Website type: Search engine
- Available in: English
- Owner: United States Government
- Creator: Unknown
- Website: science.gov
- Commercial: No
- Registration: None
- Launched: December 2002
- Current status: Online

Science.gov is a web portal and specialized search engine. Using federated search technology, Science.gov serves as a gateway to United States government scientific and technical information and research. Currently in its fifth generation, Science.gov provides a search of over 60 databases from 14 federal science agencies and 200 million pages of science information with just one query, and is a gateway to 2,200+ scientific websites.

In 2007, a report to Congress noted that in fiscal year 2007 "Science.gov experienced 6.5 million search queries across all its scientific databases and 2.6 million page views of its website." By 2012, the site had reached 34 million page views annually. In April 2007, Library Journal included Science.gov in its list of best references of 2006. Science.gov is also the United States contribution to the international portal WorldWideScience.

== History ==
Science.gov 1.0 was launched in December 2002, providing for the first time wide public access and a unified search of the government's stores of scientific and technical information. Science.gov is an interagency initiative of 18 U.S. government science organizations within 14 Federal agencies. These agencies form the voluntary Science.gov Alliance.

In May 2004, Version 2.0 was launched, introducing real-time relevancy ranking to government science retrieval. This technology, funded by the Department of Energy, helps users sort through the government's research and return results relevant to individual needs. An advanced search capability and other enhancements were added. U.S. Secretary of Energy Spencer Abraham and Director of the Office of Science Dr. Raymond L. Orbach both remarked positively on the launch of Science.gov 2.0 on May 11, 2004.

A free "Alert" service was released in February 2005, allowing users to receive e-mail alerts about current science developments in their areas of interest. Up to 25 relevant results from selected information sources can be delivered. Results are displayed in the Alert email and in a personalized Alert Archive, which stores six weeks of alerts results. In the Archive, past activity can be reviewed and Alert profiles edited.

Launched in November 2005, Version 3.0 provided more refined search queries of federal science databases. In addition, fielded searching and Boolean capabilities were enhanced.

In February 2007, Science.gov 4.0 was launched. The new version was reviewed by Gale Cengage and Government Computer News. Version 4.0 allowed further refinement of search queries, allowing users to search within their original results. The relevancy ranking algorithms became more sophisticated, providing ranking of the entire full text of documents on sites where searchable full text resides. Date of the document was priority-weighted for ranking purposes. A new feature allowed users to share search results via e-mail.

Science.gov 5.0 was launched in September 2008 and announced in a U.S. Department of Energy Press Release. The Oak Ridger covered the release as did UPI, Open Access News, Federal Computer Week, Econtent, and SLA Government Information Division. Clustering results into topics areas and the inclusion of Wikipedia topics and EurekAlert Science items related to the search were added.

== Governance ==
Governance of Science.gov is provided by the interagency Science.gov Alliance. The Alliance is co-chaired by the United States Department of Agriculture and the United States Geological Survey.

== Features and capabilities ==
Science.gov provides science search through a variety of features and capabilities, including:

- Accessing over 60 databases and 200 million pages of science information via one query
- Clustering of results by subtopics or dates to help users target their search
- Eureka Science News results related to user search terms
- Mark and send option for emailing results to friends and colleagues
- Enhanced information related to the user's real-time search
- Alerts service
- Science.gov participates in the WorldWideScience global science gateway.

== Content ==
The content for Science.gov is contributed by participating agencies including science professionals, students and teachers, and the business community. Many of these agencies are members of CENDI, which provides administrative support and coordination for Science.gov. Science.gov and the Science.gov Alliance were formed in response to the April 2001 workshop, "Strengthening the Public Information Infrastructure for Science.

== Search function providing and hosting ==
The web page search function is provided by the U.S. Geological Survey (USGS), and the "Explore Selected Science Websites by Topic" portion of the site is maintained by the CENDI Secretariat. The Science.gov website is hosted by the U.S. Department of Energy (DOE) Office of Scientific and Technical Information (OSTI), located in Oak Ridge, Tennessee, which also supplies the site's "deep web search" capability.

== See also ==
- Academic databases and search engines
