= Worksheet =

Sheet of paper on which one performs work

A worksheet, in the word's original meaning, is a sheet of paper on which one performs work. They come in many forms, most commonly associated with children's school work assignments, tax forms, and accounting or other business environments. Software is increasingly taking over the paper-based worksheet.

It can be a printed page that a student completes with a writing instrument. No other materials are needed. In education, a worksheet may have questions for students and places to record answers.

In accounting, a worksheet is, or was, a sheet of ruled paper with rows and columns on which an accountant could record information or perform calculations. These are often called columnar pads, and typically green-tinted.

In office software, spreadsheet software presents, on a computer monitor, a user interface that resembles one or more paper accounting worksheets.

== Education ==
Lowercase b handwriting worksheet for pre-schoolers with colour-in beetle.

In the classroom setting, worksheets usually refer to a loose sheet of paper with questions or exercises for students to complete and record answers. They are used, to some degree, in most subjects, and have widespread use in the math curriculum where there are two major types. The first type of math worksheet contains a collection of similar math problems or exercises. These are intended to help a student become proficient in a particular mathematical skill that was taught to them in class. They are commonly given to students as homework. The second type of math worksheet is intended to introduce new topics, and are often completed in the classroom. They are made up of a progressive set of questions that leads to an understanding of the topic to be learned.

Parents also need worksheets. With evolving curricula, parents may not have the necessary education to guide their students through homework or provide additional support at home. Having a worksheet template easily accessible can help with furthering learning at home.

As an assessment tool, worksheets can be used by teachers to understand students’ previous knowledge and the process of learning; at the same time, they can be used to enable students to monitor the progress of their own learning.

== Accounting ==
In accounting, a worksheet often refers to a loose leaf piece of stationery from a columnar pad, as opposed to one that has been bound into a physical ledger book. From this, the term was extended to designate a single, two-dimensional array of data within a computerized spreadsheet program. Common types of worksheets used in business include financial statements such as profit and loss reports. Analysts, investors, and accountants track a company's financial statements, balance sheets, and other data on worksheets.

In spreadsheet programs like LibreOffice Calc or Microsoft Excel, a single document is known as a 'workbook' and may have by default three arrays or 'worksheets'. One advantage of such programs is that they can contain formulae so that if one cell value is changed, the entire document is automatically updated, based on those formulae.

== Taxes ==
Many tax forms require complex calculations and table references to calculate a key value, or may require supplemental information that is only relevant in some cases. Rather than incorporating the calculations into the main form, they are often offloaded on a separate worksheet. The worksheet may be incorporated into the filing package, or may only be a tool for the filer to figure out the value, but without requiring the worksheet to be filed.

As an example, in the United States, income tax is withheld from the payments made by employers to employees. If taxes are significantly underwithheld, there is a penalty to the employee at the end of the year, and if they are overwitheld, the employee gets a refund for the overpayment of taxes. There is a basic formula for estimating the taxes that need to be paid, but various tax factors may cause it to be wrong, such as dependents, tax deductions, or income from other sources.
