= International Journal of Circumpolar Health =

- Discipline: Indigenous peoples' health in Arctic and Antarctic environments
- Language: English
- Edited by: Kue Young

Publication details
- Former names: Nordic Council for Arctic Medical Research Report, Arctic Medical Research
- History: 1972-present
- Publisher: Co-Action Publishing on behalf of the Circumpolar Health Research Network
- Frequency: Continuous
- Open access: Yes
- License: Creative Commons Attribution
- Impact factor: 0.707 (2015)

Standard abbreviations
- ISO 4: Int. J. Circumpolar Health

Indexing
- ISSN: 1239-9736 (print); 2242-3982 (web)
- OCLC no.: 752907556

Links
- Journal homepage

The International Journal of Circumpolar Health is a peer-reviewed healthcare journal covering issues related to the health of indigenous peoples in Arctic and Antarctic environments. It is published by the International Association of Circumpolar Health Publishers. According to the Journal Citation Reports, the journal has a 2015 impact factor of 0.707.

== Overview ==
The journal was established in 1972 as the Nordic Council for Arctic Medical Research Report. It was renamed in 1984 as Arctic Medical Research, obtaining its current name in 1997, reflecting a broader scope. In 2012 the journal moved to an online only open access format in partnership with Co-Action Publishing. Articles are published ongoing as they are ready for publication, and supplemental issues and special clusters of articles are also published.
