= NASA STI Program =

NASA information management program

The Scientific and Technical Information (STI) program of the National Aeronautics and Space Administration (NASA) collects, organizes, preserves, and releases the Agency's scientific and technical information. STI is derived from NASA's research and development efforts and NASA projects, programs, and missions. The program is essential in helping NASA avoid duplication of research, by sharing information to ensure that the U.S. maintains its preeminence in aerospace-related industries and education. Examples of NASA STI include technical papers and reports, contractor reports, conference papers and proceedings, journal articles, presentations, and technical information on websites.

== Management ==
The STI Program Office is funded by the NASA Chief Information Officer (CIO) in Washington, DC. The program, which is located at NASA's Langley Research Center in Hampton, Virginia, is charged to collect NASA STI, organize it into a database, ensure that it is preserved via the National Archives and Records Administration, and release the STI via NASA portals or via other channels, such as science.gov and USA.gov. The STI Program participates in the collaborative Open Government Initiative and is a member of CENDI, which is a partnership of Federal STI managers.

The STI Program is a critical component in the worldwide activity of scientific and technical aerospace research and development. The program's charter exists so that NASA STI is promptly and widely released and available, and can be leveraged by NASA, U.S. businesses, government, the public and international entities. This allows NASA to comply with e-Government regulations.

== Organization ==
STI is collected from U.S. and international sources and then organized according to content prior to being added to the STI Repository, formerly the NASA Technical Reports Server (NTRS). The STI Repository is a world-class collection of STI that includes over 4 million metadata records and over 586K documents. This database has two segments: The STI Repository for publicly available NASA STI, and registered content available by registration only to NASA civil servants, contractors, and grantees. It was preceded by the Scientific and Technical Aerospace Reports.

NASA STI also includes research information from NASA's predecessor agency, the National Advisory Committee for Aeronautics (NACA), which dates back to 1915 and transitioned to NASA at the advent of the National Aeronautics and Space Act of 1958 (Amended).

== Access ==
The STI website provides products, services and tools to access and benefit from NASA STI.

- Search NASA's public STI collections for reports, conference papers, proceedings, journal articles and other technical and peer-reviewed STI through the STI Repository (NTRS). The STI Repository has:
  - More than 647,000 metadata records and full-text aerospace STI documents
  - Over 4.3 million metadata records
  - Over 586,000 full-text documents
  - More than 2,500 videos
  - Over 28,000 full-text documents from NASA's predecessor, NACA
- Locate publishing tools such as writing resources and style guides as well as the NASA Thesaurus and the NASA Scope and Subject Category Guide.
- Access the NASA STI Repository OpenAPI along with API documentation and guidance.

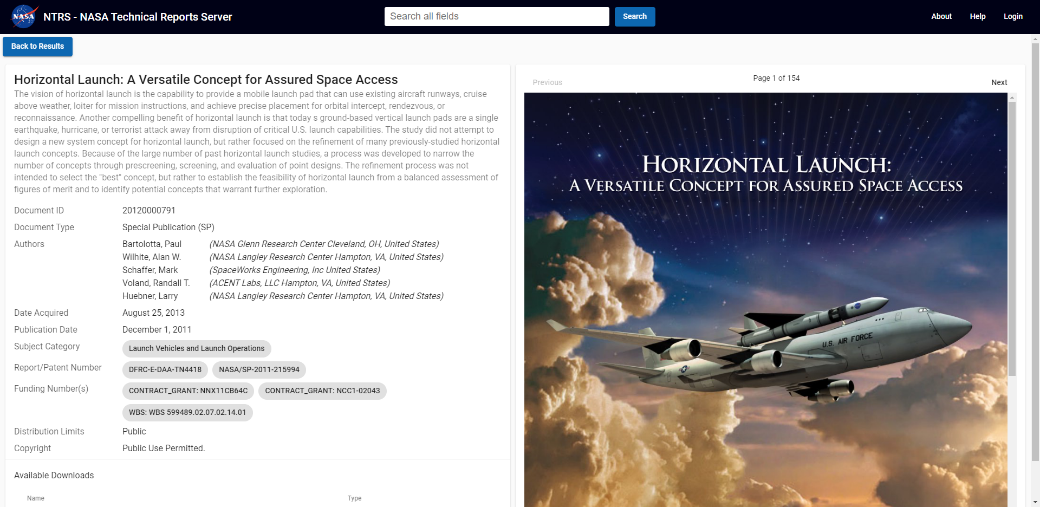
Screen shot showing a record display after searching the STI Repository, with the resulting PDF document that is available to download directly from the repository.
