= Paperity =

Bibliographic database

Paperity is a multidisciplinary aggregator of open access journals and papers. It was launched in October 2014 with 160,000 articles.

As of December 2020, Paperity includes 7.2 million articles from 15,300 journals, covering academic disciplines including mathematical sciences, life sciences, medicine, social sciences, and humanities. Paperity provides full-text search, RSS feeds and a mobile application to access the literature. All articles are available in full text without fees.

Paperity shares the aggregated metadata with other academic services such as OCLC.
