= European Centre for the Development of Vocational Training =

Agency of the European Union

European Centre for the Development of Professional Training

Agency overview
- Formed: 16 February 1975
- Jurisdiction: European Union
- Headquarters: Thessaloniki, Greece
- Agency executive: Jürgen Siebel, Executive Director
- Key document: Regulation (EU) 2019/128
- Website: cedefop.europa.eu

Map
- European Centre for the Development of Vocational Training (European Union)

The European Centre for the Development of Professional Training (Cedefop) is an agency of the European Union. The Agency was established in 1975. Cedefop is headquartered and located in Thessaloniki Region, Greece, and has a Brussels office. Cedefop is the acronym of its French title, Centre Européen pour le Développement de la Formation Professionnelle (C.E.DE.FO.P.). Cedefop supports the development of European professional education policies and contributes to their implementation.

Cedefop works closely with the European Commission, governments, representatives of employers and trade unions, researchers and practitioners in professional education, with the aim of strengthening European cooperation. It provides the evidence on which to base European professional education policy and identifies trends in and challenges for professional education. The agency also brings together policy-makers, social partners, researchers and practitioners to share ideas and debate the best ways to improve European professional education policies. The issues it covers span guidance and counselling; training for older workers; forecasting the demand and supply of skills; the recognition and validation of learning that takes place outside the education system; and the development of qualification frameworks.

== History ==
Against a background of social changes and economic problems in the mid-1970s, Cedefop emerged as a consensus among Member States of the then European Economic Community (EEC) over the need to improve professional education. Although education had been a research field since the early 1960s, the late 1960s and early 1970s saw a trend towards more focused and systematic research into professional education. West Germany set up its Federal Institute for Professional Training Research (Bundesinstitut für Berufsbildungsforschung) in 1969. In France, the Centre d'études et de recherches sur les qualifications (CEREQ) was set up in 1970. Three years later, Italy also set up a professional training institute, the Istituto per lo sviluppo della formazione professionale dei lavoratori (ISFOL).

In 1970, the EEC's Economic and Social Committee set up a study group to examine education and training in the then six EEC Member States. The committee proposed establishing a European institute for professional training research and guidance, largely based on the West German model.

Cedefop was established on 10 February 1975. Its location in West Berlin was a clear signal that the western sector of the then divided city was a part of the EEC. In October 1993 the Council of Ministers decided to relocate Cedefop to Greece. On 1 September 1995 Cedefop moved to provisional premises in Thessaloniki, and to its own building in August 1999. Much of Cedefop's early work involved studying the comparability of professional training qualifications in Member States. Around 200 occupations were categorised and their equivalence with other occupations and qualifications determined. The assumption was that professional training policies in Member States would increasingly be brought into line with each other leading to a mutual recognition of qualifications and certificates and development of a common professional training policy, as foreseen under Article 128 of the Treaty of Rome.

However, agreement was not reached on mutual recognition, other than for the regulated professions, or on a common professional training policy. The 1992 Treaty on European Union (Article 129) changed the role of EU policy on professional training to one of supporting and supplementing action of Member States, while fully respecting the responsibility of Member States for the content and organisation of professional training. This role has been transferred to Article 166 of the Treaty of Lisbon, which entered into force on 1 December 2009.

== Governance ==
Cedefop is run by a Management Board on which national governments, trade unions, employers' organisations and the European Commission are represented. Day-to-day operation is the responsibility of the executive director, who is appointed by the European Commission on the basis of recommendations from the Management Board. Cedefop's budget comes from the European Commission.

== Activities ==
Cedefop provides comparative analyses and expertise gathered through research and networking. Its activities cover initial and continuing professional education and aspects of lifelong learning. They integrate the interests, priorities, and needs of policy-makers among its major partners; the European Commission, Member States and the social partners.

Cedefop contributes to the concept, design and supports the implementation of common European tools, such as the European qualifications framework, European credit system in professional education, the European quality assurance reference framework, the Skills Intelligence and Europass. Collectively, these tools support mobility for learning both within national systems and across borders. The annual report of activities is submitted to the European Union institutions.
