= Alert messaging =

Machine-to-person communication that is important or time sensitive

Alert messaging (or alert notification) is machine-to-person communication that is important or time-sensitive. An alert may be a calendar reminder or a notification of a new message.

Alert messaging emerged from the study of personal information management (PIM), the science of discovering how people perform certain tasks to acquire, organize, maintain, retrieve and use information relevant to them. Alert notification is a natural evolution of the concept of RSS which makes it possible for people to keep up with web sites in an automated manner. Alerting makes it possible for people to keep up with the information that matters most to them.

Alerts are typically delivered through a notification system and the most common application of the service is machine-to-person communication. Very basic services provide notification services via email or SMS. More advanced systems (for example AOL) provides users with the choice of selecting a preferred delivery channel such as e-mail, Short Message Service (SMS), instant messaging (IM), via voice through voice portals, desktop alerts and more. Novel approaches provide users with the ability to schedule their own alerts (for example Outlook Calendar). The most sophisticated service providers embrace all capabilities, aggregating a multitude of reminder, notifications and alert, catering the delivery system to the specific context of the content being delivered thus enabling users to create sophisticated scenarios.

== Alerts and spam ==
The notion of content being delivered to users has received negative connotation over the years and is sometimes labeled as spamming, particularly for information that hasn't been requested by the user. The advent of technologies such as RSS and now alert notification are an effort directed to creating an antithesis to spam: the information being received by users is exclusively from opt-in requests.

== FCC ==
The Federal Communications Commission is continually working to improve their ability to put in place a notification system in case of emergency, in an attempt to help protect citizens. The first system was the Emergency Broadcast System, an emergency warning system in the United States, used from 1963 to 1997, when it was replaced by the Emergency Alert System. On April 9, 2008, the FCC approved an emergency alert text-messaging system so that cellular telephone users can get text message alerts in case of emergencies.

== See also ==
- Google Alerts
- AlertOps
