= Office of Scientific and Technical Information =

Component of the Office of Science within the U.S. Department of Energy

Agency overview
- Jurisdiction: United States Government

The Office of Scientific and Technical Information (OSTI) is a component of the Office of Science within the U.S. Department of Energy (DOE). The Energy Policy Act PL 109–58, Section 982, called out the responsibility of OSTI: "The Secretary, through the Office of Scientific and Technical Information, shall maintain with the Department publicly available collections of scientific and technical information resulting from research, development, demonstration, and commercial applications activities supported by the Department."

== Resources ==
OSTI provides access to energy, science, and technology information through publicly available web-based systems, with supporting tools and technologies to enable information search, retrieval and re-use.

== Science information resources freely available for public use ==
- OSTI.GOV - The primary search tool for DOE science, technology, and engineering R&D results and the organizational hub for information about DOE OSTI;
- DOE PAGES (DOE Public Access Gateway for Energy and Science) - The DOE discovery tool that makes peer-reviewed scholarly scientific publications resulting from DOE research funding publicly accessible to read, download, and analyze;
- DOE CODE is an open source, submission and search tool for DOE-funded software;
- DOE ScienceCinema is a collection of multimedia videos highlighting DOE's scientific research; As of 09/05/2025, it is no longer maintained as a stand-alone search product. The contents may be searched within OSTI.GOV through a minimal number of extra steps.
- DOE Data Explorer searches collections of DOE scientific research data, such as computer simulations, figures and plots, interactive maps, multimedia, numeric files and scientific images.
- DOE Patents provides a searchable database of patent information resulting from DOE-sponsored research and development.
- Science.gov OSTI hosts this USA.gov science portal in collaboration with 17 organizations within 13 Federal science agencies. These agencies are also members of CENDI, a cooperative group of scientific and technical information (STI) managers from the 13 federal agencies and programs. Science.gov provides a gateway to over 2,100 websites and offers deep web searching of more than 50 databases containing science information and R&D results.

OSTI's entire line of electronic products may be accessed through its home page, where users may search multiple databases with one query.

== Related legislation ==
- 1946 – Atomic Energy Act PL 79-585 (created the U.S. Atomic Energy Commission)
- 1954 – Atomic Energy Act Amendments PL 83-703
- 1974 – Energy Reorganization Act of 1974 PL 93-438 (Split the AEC into the Energy Research and Development Administration and the Nuclear Regulatory Commission)
- 1977 – Department of Energy Organization Act PL 95-91 (Dismantled ERDA and replaced it with the Department of Energy)
- 2005 – Energy Policy Act PL 109-58
- 2007 – America COMPETES Act PL 110-69

== See also ==
- Federated search
- Web harvesting
- Science.gov
