= Bibliographic database =

Database providing an authoritative source of bibliographic information

A bibliographic database is a database of bibliographic records. This is an organised online collection of references to published written works like journal and newspaper articles, conference proceedings, reports, government and legal publications, patents and books. In contrast to library catalogue entries, a majority of the records in bibliographic databases describe articles and conference papers rather than complete monographs, and they generally contain very rich subject descriptions in the form of keywords, subject classification terms, or abstracts.

A bibliographic database may cover a wide range of topics or one academic field like computer science. A significant number of bibliographic databases are marketed under a trade name by licensing agreement from vendors, or directly from their makers: the indexing and abstracting services.

Many bibliographic databases have evolved into digital libraries, providing the full text of the organised contents:for instance CORE also organises and mirrors scholarly articles and OurResearch develops a search engine for open access content in Unpaywall. Others merge with non-bibliographic and scholarly databases to create more complete disciplinary search engine systems, such as Chemical Abstracts or Entrez.

== History ==
Prior to the mid-20th century, individuals searching for published literature had to rely on printed bibliographic indexes, generated manually from index cards.

During the early 1960s computers were used to digitize text for the first time; the purpose was to reduce the cost and time required to publish two American abstracting journals, the Index Medicus of the National Library of Medicine and the Scientific and Technical Aerospace Reports of the National Aeronautics and Space Administration (NASA). By the late 1960s, such bodies of digitized alphanumeric information, known as bibliographic and numeric databases, constituted a new type of information resource. Online interactive retrieval became commercially viable in the early 1970s over private telecommunications networks. The first services offered a few databases of indexes and abstracts of scholarly literature. These databases contained bibliographic descriptions of journal articles that were searchable by keywords in author and title, and sometimes by journal name or subject heading. The user interfaces were crude, the access was expensive, and searching was done by librarians on behalf of "end users".

== See also ==
- Citation index
- Document-oriented database
- Full-text database
- Institutional repository
- List of academic databases and search engines
- Online public access catalog (OPAC; library catalog)
