= Google Patents =

Search engine from Google that indexes patents and patent applications

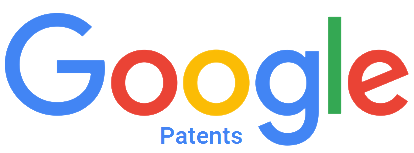
- Website type: Digital library for patents
- Creator: Google
- Website: patents.google.com
- Registration: Not required
- Launched: December 14, 2006; 19 years ago

Google Patents is a search engine from Google that indexes patents and patent applications.

== Contents ==
Google Patents indexes more than 87 million patents and patent applications with full text from 17 patent offices, including:

- United States Patent and Trademark Office (USPTO),
- European Patent Office (EPO),
- China's National Intellectual Property Administration (CNIPA),
- Japan Patent Office (JPO),
- Korean Intellectual Property Office (KIPO),
- World Intellectual Property Organization (WIPO),
- Deutsches Patent- und Markenamt (DPMA),
- Canadian Intellectual Property Office (CIPO),
- Rospatent (Russia),
- Intellectual Property Office (United Kingdom),
- National Institute of Industrial Property (France),
- the Netherlands Patent Office,
- offices of Spain, Belgium, Denmark, Finland, and Luxembourg.

These documents include the entire collection of granted patents and published patent applications from each database (which belong to the public domain). US patent documents date back to 1790, EPO and WIPO to 1978. Optical character recognition (OCR) has been performed on the older US patents to make them searchable, and Google Translate has been used on all non-English patents to make the English translations searchable.

Google Patents also indexes documents from Google Scholar and Google Books, and has machine-classified them with Cooperative Patent Classification codes for searching.

Patent litigation information is also available in Google Patents through a partnership with Darts-ip, a global patent litigation database.

== History and background ==
The service was launched on December 14, 2006. Google says it uses "the same technology as that underlying Google Books", allowing scrolling through pages, and zooming in on areas. The images are saveable as PNG files.

Google Patents was updated in 2012 with coverage of the European Patent Office (EPO) and the Prior Art Finder tool.

In 2013, it was expanded to cover World Intellectual Property Organization (WIPO), German Patent Office (German: Deutsches Patent- und Markenamt, DPMA), Canadian Intellectual Property Office (CIPO), and China's National Intellectual Property Administration (CNIPA). All foreign patents were also translated to English and made searchable.

In 2015, a new version was introduced at patents.google.com with a new UI, integration of Google Scholar with machine-classified with Cooperative Patent Classifications (CPCs), and search result clustering into CPCs.

In 2016, coverage of 11 additional patent offices was announced. Support for the USPTO and EPO Boolean search syntax (proximity, wildcards, title/abstract/claims fields) was introduced, as well as visual graphs of inventors, assignees and CPCs by date, a thumbnail grid view of search results and downloadable result sets as CSV.

In 2018, global litigation information has been added. Google Patents pages display if a patent (or any member of its family) has a litigation history anywhere in the world and provides a link to the Darts-ip patent cases database.

== See also ==
- Baidu Patents
- Espacenet
- INPADOC
- Patentscope
