= Pain Physician =

Peer-reviewed medical journal

- Discipline: Neurology
- Language: English
- Edited by: Alan David Kaye, MD, PhD

Publication details
- History: 1999–present
- Publisher: American Society of Interventional Pain Physicians (United States)
- Frequency: 8/year
- Open access: Yes
- Impact factor: 4.965 (2020)

Standard abbreviations
- ISO 4: Pain Physician

Indexing
- ISSN: 1533-3159 (print); 2150-1149 (web)

Links
- Journal homepage

Pain Physician is an open-access peer-reviewed scientific journal publishing research in interventional pain management. It is the official publication of the American Society of Interventional Pain Physicians.

== Abstracting and indexing ==
This journal is indexed in the following databases:

- Current Contents
- Essential Science Indicators
- Science Citation Index Expanded
- Scopus

According to the Journal Citation Reports, the journal had a 2015 impact factor of 3.407.
