= Annals of Physics =

Annals of Physics (New York)
- Discipline: Physics
- Language: English
- Edited by: Neil Turok

Publication details
- History: 1957–present
- Publisher: Elsevier
- Frequency: Monthly
- Impact factor: 3.0 (2025)

Standard abbreviations
- ISO 4: Ann. Phys. (N. Y.)
- MathSciNet: Ann. Physics

Indexing
- CODEN: APNYA6
- ISSN: 0003-4916 (print); 1096-035X (web)
- LCCN: 58002769
- OCLC no.: 1481402

Links
- Journal homepage; Online archive

Annals of Physics is a monthly peer-reviewed scientific journal covering all aspects of physics. It was established in 1957 and is published by Elsevier. The editor-in-chief is Neil Turok (University of Edinburgh School of Physics and Astronomy).

== Abstracting and indexing ==
The journal is abstracted and indexed in:

- Astrophysics Data Systems
- Chemical Abstracts
- Current Contents/Physics
- Current Contents/Chemistry & Earth Science
- International Aerospace Abstracts
- Mathematical Reviews
- Nuclear Science Abstracts
- Science Abstracts/Physics Abstracts
- Science Citation Index
- Scopus
- Zentralblatt MATH

According to the Journal Citation Reports, the journal has a 2025 impact factor of 3.
