= Global Dossier =

Online patent file service

The Global Dossier is an online public service launched in June 2014 by the five "IP5" offices, i.e. the European Patent Office (EPO), the Japan Patent Office (JPO), the Korean Intellectual Property Office (KIPO), China's National Intellectual Property Administration (CNIPA) and the US Patent and Trademark Office (USPTO), to offer an integrated access to the respective "file wrappers", free of charge and with automatic machine translations to English. A file wrapper, also called "public file", contains documents, including the search reports, office actions and correspondence between the applicant and the patent office, relating to a particular patent application. The file wrapper therefore provides the file history of a patent application.

Access to Global Dossier is available via the USPTO, the European Patent Register and espacenet.

== See also ==
- Patent family
