= DPK =

DPK may refer to:

- Deer Park railway station, Melbourne
- The contemporary Democratic Party of Korea (Korean: 더불어민주당), a major political party in South Korea.
- Democratic Party of Kosovo (Albanian: Partia Demokratike e Kosovës), a political party in Kosovo.
- Democratic Political Turning Point (Dutch: Democratisch Politiek Keerpunt), a political party in the Netherlands.
- Deutsche Patentklassifikation, the German Patent Classification system.
- Difa-e-Pakistan Council, an umbrella coalition of several Islamic oriented parties in Pakistani politics
- a Digital Product Key
- Dipropyl ketone, also known as 4-heptanone

== See also ==
- DKP
- KPD
