= Patent visualisation =

Patent visualisation is an application of information visualisation. The number of patents has been increasing, encouraging companies to consider intellectual property as a part of their strategy. Patent visualisation, like patent mapping, is used to quickly view a patent portfolio.

Software dedicated to patent visualisation began to appear in 2000, for example Aureka from Aurigin (now owned by Thomson Reuters). Many patent and portfolio analytics platforms, such as Questel, Patent Forecast, PatSnap, Patentcloud, Relecura, Slate and Patent iNSIGHT Pro, offer options to visualise specific data within patent documents by creating topic maps, priority maps, IP Landscape reports, etc. Software converts patents into infographics or maps, to allow the analyst to "get insight into the data" and draw conclusions. Also called patinformatics, it is the "science of analysing patent information to discover relationships and trends that would be difficult to see when working with patent documents on a one-and-one basis".

Patents contain structured data (like publication numbers) and unstructured text (like title, abstract, claims and visual info). Structured data are processed by data-mining and unstructured data are processed with text-mining.

== Data mining ==
The main step in processing structured information is data-mining, which emerged in the late 1980s. Data mining involves statistics, artificial intelligence, and machine learning. Patent data mining extracts information from the structured data of the patent document. These structured data are bibliographic fields such as location, date or status.

=== Structured fields ===
Structured data	Description	Business Intelligence use
Data	Patents contain identifying data including priority, publication data and the issue date.: Priority data regroup priority number assigned for the first application, the corresponding date and priority country.; The publication data encompasses the publication number given when the patent is published, 18 months after filling and the publication date.; The issue date is the data the patent is granted, usually 3.5 years after filling depending on the patent office.	Crossing dates and locations fields offer a global vision of a technology in time and space.
Assignee	Patent assignees are organizations or individuals - the owners of the patent.	The field can offer a ranking of the principal actors of the environment, thus allowing us to visualise potential competitors or partners.
Inventor	Inventors develop the invention/patent.	Inventors' field combined with the assignee field can create a social network and provide a method to follow field experts.
Classification	The classification can regroup inventions with similar technologies. The most commonly used is the International Patent Classification (IPC). However, patent organizations have their own classification; for instance, the European Patent Office has framed the ECLA.	Grouping patents by theme offers an overview of the corpus and the potential applications of studied technology.
Status	The legal status indicates whether an application is filed, approved, or rejected.	Patent family and legal status searching is important for litigation and competitive intelligence.

=== Advantages ===
Data mining allows study of filing patterns of competitors and locates main patent filers within a specific area of technology. This approach can be helpful to monitor competitors' environments, moves and innovation trends and gives a macro view of a technology status.

== Text-mining ==
=== Principle ===
Text mining is used to search through unstructured text documents. This technique is widely used on the Internet, it has had success in bioinformatics and now in the intellectual property environment.

Text mining is based on a statistical analysis of word recurrence in a corpus. An algorithm extracts words and expressions from title, summary and claims and gathers them by declension. "And" and "if" are labeled as non-information bearing words and are stored in the stopword list. Stoplists can be specialised in order to create an accurate analysis. Next, the algorithm ranks the words by weight, according to their frequency in the patent's corpus and the document frequency containing this word. The score for each word is calculated using a formula such as:

$Weight=\frac{Term\ Frequency}{Document\ Frequency}=\frac{Frequency\ of\ the\ word\ or\ expression\ in\ the\ Text\ Sea}{Number\ of\ documents\ containing\ the\ expression\ or\ word}$

A frequently used word in several documents has less weight than a word used frequently in a few patents. Words under a minimum weight are eliminated, leaving a list of pertinent words or descriptors. Each patent is associated to the descriptors found in the selected document. Further, in the process of clusterisation, these descriptors are used as subsets, in which the patent are regrouped or as tags to place the patents in predetermined categories, for example keywords from International Patent Classifications.

Four text parts can be processed with text-mining :

- Title
- Abstract
- Claim
- Patent Full-Text

Software offer different combinations but title, abstract and claim are generally the most used, providing a good balance between interferences and relevancy.

=== Advantages ===
Text-mining can be used to narrow a search or quickly evaluate a patent corpus. For instance, if a query produces irrelevant documents, a multi-level clustering hierarchy identifies them in order to delete them and refine the search. Text-mining can also be used to create internal taxonomies specific to a corpus for possible mapping.

== Visualisations ==
Allying patent analysis and informatic tools offers an overview of the environment through value-added visualisations. As patents contain structured and unstructured information, visualisations fall in two categories. Structured data can be rendered with data mining in macrothematic maps and statistical analysis. Unstructured information can be shown in like clouds, cluster maps and 2D keyword maps.

=== Data mining visualisation ===
Visualisation	Picture	Description	Business Intelligence use
Matrix chart	Picture	Graphic organizer used to summarize a multidimensional data set in a grid	Data comparison
Location map	Picture	Map with overlaid data values on geographic regions	Spatial patterns; Find innovative jurisdictions
Bar chart	Picture	Graph with rectangular bars proportional to the values that they represent, useful for numerical comparisons.	Data evolution
Line graph	Picture	Graph used to summarize how two parameters are related and how they vary.	Data evolution and relationships
Pie chart	Picture	Circular chart divided into sections, to illustrate proportions.	Data comparison
Bubble chart	Picture	3-axis 2D chart which enables visualization similar to the Magic quadrant chart.	Market maturity; Competitive analysis; Licensing opportunities

=== Text mining visualisation ===
Visualisation	Description	Business Intelligence use
Tree list	Hierarchy list	Evaluating relevance; Taxonomy; Concept relationships
Tag cloud	Full text of concepts. The size of each word is determined by its frequency in the corpus	Evaluating relevance; More visual than the tree list
2D keyword map	Tomographic map with quantitative representation of relief, usually using contour lines and colors. Distance on map is proportional to the difference between themes.	Landscape vision of thematics; Similarity vision with SOM; Monitoring competitors
	2D hierarchical cluster map with quantitative and qualitative representation of document set association to topic, usually using quantized cells and colors. Size of topic cells may represent patent count per topic relative to overall document set. Density and distribution inside of a topic cell may be proportional to document count relative to association to the topic and strength of association, respectively.	Landscape vision of thematics; Monitoring competitors or a technology space; Identifying trends in a defined patent set
	Text is decomposed into logical groupings and sub-groupings, then represented as a navigable hierarchy of those groupings by means of proportionate circle arcs.	Landscape vision of thematics; Monitoring a technology space; Interactive navigation and granularity

=== Visualisation for both data-mining and text-mining ===
Mapping visualisations can be used for both text-mining and data-mining results.

Visualisation	Picture	Description	Business Intelligence use
Tree map	Picture	Visualization of hierarchical structures. Each data item, or row in the data set is represented by a rectangle, whose area is proportional to selected parameters.	Landscape vision of hierarchical thematics; Position of competitors or technology by thematics
Network map	Picture	In a network diagram, entities are connected to each other in the form of a node and link diagram.	Relationship visions; Monitoring similar competitors or technologies
Citation map	Picture	In the citation map, the date of citation is visualized on the x axis and each individual citation takes an entry on the y axis. A strong vertical line indicates the filing date, showing which citations are cited by the patent as opposed to those which cite the patent.	Qualitative and quantitative view of citation history and density

== Uses ==
What patent visualisation can highlight:

- Competitors
- Partners
- New innovations
- Technologic environment description
- Networks

Field application:

- R&D strategy management
- Competitive intelligence
- Licensing
- Strategy

== See also ==
- Intellectual property analytics
