= Espacenet =

Patent database

Espacenet (formerly stylized as esp@cenet) is a free online service for searching patents and patent applications. Espacenet was developed by the European Patent Office (EPO) together with the member states of the European Patent Organisation. Most member states have an Espacenet service in their national language, and access to the EPO's worldwide database, most of which is in English. In 2022, the Espacenet worldwide service claimed to have records on more than 140 million patent publications.

== History ==
By launching Espacenet in 1998, the EPO is said to have "revolutionized public access to international patent information, releasing patent data from its paper prisons and changing forever how patents are disseminated, organized, searched, and retrieved."

In 2004, i.e. in the early years of Espacenet, Nancy Lambert considered that, although free, Espacenet, like the United States Patent and Trademark Office (USPTO) database of US patents, "still tend[ed] to have primitive search engines and in some cases rather cumbersome mechanisms to download patents." She reported it as being deliberate, on the part of the USPTO and EPO, "who have said they do not wish to compete unfairly with commercial vendors". In 2009, Espacenet offered the so-called SmartSearch which allows a query to be composed using a subset of Contextual Query Language (CQL).

In 2012, the EPO launched "Patent Translate", a free online automatic translation service for patents. Created in partnership with Google, the translation engine was "specifically built to handle complex and technical patent vocabulary", using "millions of official, human-translated patent documents" to train the translation engine. It covers translations between English and 31 other languages. According to the Patent Information News' magazine published by the EPO, a 2013 independent study compared Espacenet with DepatisNet, Freepatentsonline, Google Patent and the public search facility at the USPTO. In that study, Espacenet reportedly obtained the highest score for both data coverage and customer support, and the best overall aggregated score.

In March 2016, Espacenet began offering full-text search through its collection of English, French and German patent documents.

== See also ==
- Cooperative Patent Classification
- Global Dossier, a service available via espacenet
- INPADOC
- International Patent Classification
- Patent classification
- Patentscope
- Prior art
