= F-term (patent law) =

In Japanese patent law, F-term is a system for classifying Japanese patent documents according to the technical features of the inventions described in them. It is not a replacement for the International Patent Classification (IPC) or other patent classifications, but complements other systems by providing a means for searching documents from different viewpoints. A symbol attached to a patent document, indicating that the invention disclosed in the document has a particular technical feature, is also called an F-term.
