= Search report =

Documents relevant to a patent application

In patent law, a search report is a report established by a patent office, which mentions documents which may be taken into consideration in deciding whether the invention to which a patent application relates is patentable. The documents mentioned in the search report usually form part of the prior art.

== Patent law ==
=== Categories of documents ===
Letters are often included in search reports established for patent applications to indicate the relevance of the documents identified by the examiner. For instance, the European Patent Office (EPO) uses the following letters in search reports or in the European Patent Register:

Category	Meaning (in search reports established for a European patent application, or in the European Patent Register)
A	Technological background. Used for a document representing "state of the art not [regarded as] prejudicial to the novelty or inventive step of the claimed invention."
D	Document cited in the application, i.e. cited by the applicant itself.
E	Potentially conflicting patent documents, i.e. document "bearing a filing or priority date earlier than the filing date of the application searched ... but published later than that date and the content of which would constitute prior art relevant to novelty." See also Article 54(3) EPC and Article 56 EPC.
I	This category is not used in search reports but in the European Patent Register for a single "X" document "particularly relevant for reasons of inventive step". See category X.
L	Documents cited for other reasons (than the other codes). For example, if an examiner "considers that a publication, although undated, is highly relevant to the invention and can therefore be considered to be of interest to the applicant or third parties, he may choose to cite the publication in the search report as an "L" document. The search report and the written opinion should explain why this document was cited."
O	Non-written disclosure.
P	Intermediate documents, i.e. "[documents] published on dates falling between the date of filing of the application being examined and the date of priority claimed, or the earliest priority if there is more than one. Such a document may be relevant if the claimed priority is not valid.
T	Documents relating to the theory or principle underlying the invention.
X	Highest possible level of relevance. In search reports, "Category "X" is applicable where a document is such that when taken alone, a claimed invention cannot be considered novel or cannot be considered to involve an inventive step." "In September 2011, the EPO started differentiating internally between two types of "X" citation. This differentiation [is not] visible in search reports, but can be found in the European Patent Register..." "For citations coming from search reports published after 28 September 2011: "X" indicates that a single document is particularly relevant for reasons of novelty; "I" indicates that a single document is particularly relevant for reasons of inventive step – in the written search report this continues to appear as "X""
Y	Document particularly relevant if combined with another "Y" document.

Combinations of different categories are possible. For instance, a document classified as "D, A", i.e. in categories "D" and "A", would be a document cited in the application and regarded as representing the technological background of the invention.

== See also ==
- Office action
- Grant procedure before the European Patent Office
- Patent analysis
