= FIZ Karlsruhe =

Nonprofit organisation

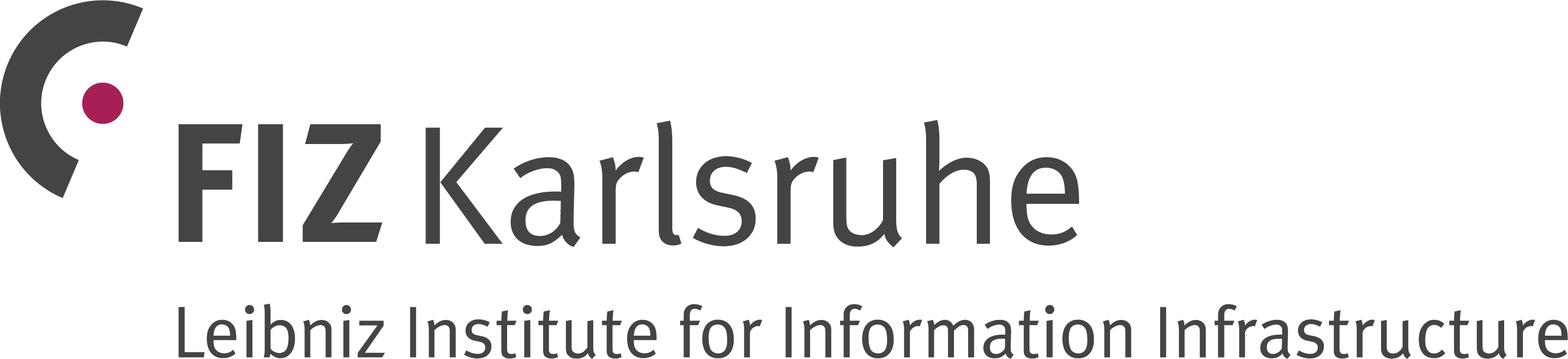
- FIZ Karlsruhe — Leibniz-Institut für Informationsinfrastruktur
- Formation: 1977
- Type: Nonprofit
- Headquarters: Karlsruhe
- Location: Germany
- Coordinates: 49.091713°N 8.428381°E
- Official language: German, English
- CEO: Wolfram Horstmann
- Website: www.fiz-karlsruhe.de/en

FIZ Karlsruhe — Leibniz Institute for Information Infrastructure, formerly Fachinformationszentrum Karlsruhe, is a not-for-profit company with the public mission to make sci-tech information from all over the world publicly available and to provide related services in order to support the national and international transfer of knowledge and the promotion of innovation. It was established in 1977 with its members being the Federal Government of Germany and each of the states of Germany. In 1984, its membership expanded to include the Max Planck Society, Fraunhofer-Gesellschaft, the German Physical Society, Verein Deutscher Ingenieure, and the German Informatics Society.

Its purpose is to be the national center for information on all aspects of German national matters of energy, nuclear technology, physics, astronomy, mathematics, and computer science. It is a database supplier for all of these sectors.

== History ==
In 1985 the organization was based at the Karlsruhe Institute of Technology with branch offices in Berlin, Bonn and New York.

== Databases ==
The service institution is member of Gottfried Wilhelm Leibniz Scientific Community, a union of German research institutes. The institute provides information services and infrastructure for the academic and research community and maintains a collection of scientific databases.

Business areas:

1. STN International, the online service for sci-tech research and patent information, offers a wide array of databases, the FIZ AutoDoc full-text delivery service, and retrieval, analysis, and visualization functions. STN is developed and operated by FIZ Karlsruhe in cooperation with CAS (Chemical Abstracts Service, Columbus/Ohio). The Scientific & Technical Information Network, offered in partnership with the Chemical Abstracts Service (CAS), resells over 200 scientific and patent databases including CAS REGISTRY and CAplus, INSPEC, Compendex, Derwent World Patents Index, INPADOC, the USPTO Genetic Sequence Database (USGENE), and GENESEQ. In May 2009, FIZ Karlsruhe became the European marketing agent for the SequenceBase data subscription version of USGENE.
2. KnowEsis comprises e-Science solutions, e.g. digital infrastructures, independent of scientific disciplines, that support the process of research in all its stages, from idea to experiment, analysis, data aggregation, and publication. The activities focus on virtual research environments, hosting, and long-term availability.
3. Databases and Information Services comprises both conventional database production and the development and operation of science portals in the following subject areas:
  - Mathematics and computer science: The main product here is zbMATH (Zentralblatt für Mathematik), an abstracting service in mathematics research, offering detailed abstracts and reviews dating back to 1868. The computer science portal io-port.net provides access to computer science publications from all over the world.
  - Crystallography and chemistry: The Inorganic Crystal Structure Database (ICSD). FIZ Karlsruhe also indexes scientific publications for the CA database on behalf of Chemical Abstracts Service (CAS).
  - Energy: On behalf of the Federal Ministry of Education and Research (BMBF) FIZ Karlsruhe represents Germany in the international co-operations ETDE and INIS producing the databases ENERGY (energy and energy technology) and INIS (peaceful use of nuclear research and nuclear technology). On behalf of the Federal Ministry of Economics and Technology (BMWi), FIZ Karlsruhe’s BINE information service supports the targeted dissemination of research results in the fields of energy efficiency and renewables.

FIZ Karlsruhe also conducts applied research on data management, information mining and information retrieval in close collaboration with academic institutions and research organizations and offers professional training and support to young scientists.

- Zentralblatt MATH zbMATH Database (formerly Zentralblatt für Mathematik - Mathematics Abstracts)
- MathEduc Database (formerly ZDM: Zentralblatt für Didaktik der Mathematik / International Reviews on Mathematical Education)
- io-port, an informatics portal and computer science database, also containing entries from the Computer Science section of Zentralblatt MATH
- Inorganic Crystal Structure Database
- ETDEWEB, Energy Technology Data Exchange (ETDE)
- ENERGY, a bibliographic database on energy research and energy technology. "The (FIZ Karlsruhe) ENERGY database is produced in collaboration with the Energy Technology Data Exchange (ETDE), a program of the International Energy Agency (IEA)."

== See also ==
- Dagstuhl
