= Hydroflyer =

Electric hydrofoil watercraft

Hydroflyer is an electric hydrofoil watercraft developed by Canadian inventor Jerry McArthur in collaboration with hydrofoil manufacturer Unifoil. The vehicle combines characteristics of a hydrofoil board and a personal watercraft and includes handlebars with an integrated throttle, designed to provide additional stability and control compared with traditional eFoils. It features a boat-style hull with additional volume in the bow, designed to keep the craft more stable when contacting the water and to prevent abrupt nose dives on touchdown.

== History ==
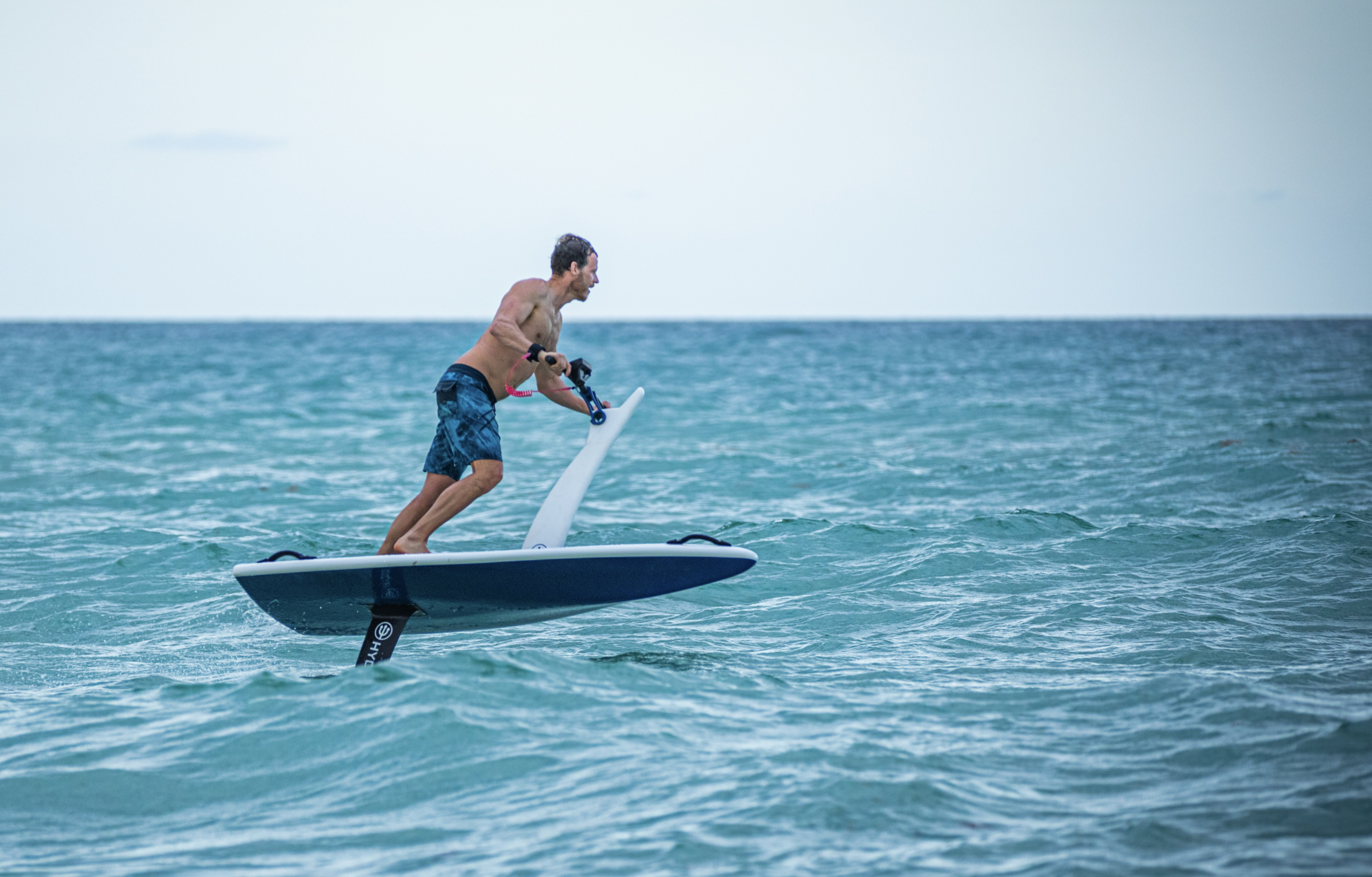
Hydroflyer outside Haulover Inlet, Miami-Dade County, Florida, USA

The Hydroflyer was developed by McArthur to create a more stable and accessible form of electric hydrofoiling. Unifoil partnered on the project, and production models were introduced in 2021.

In April 2023, Uni Electric Vehicles Inc., co-founded by McArthur, was granted United States design patent D984,352 S for the Hydroflyer’s design.

== Design and features ==
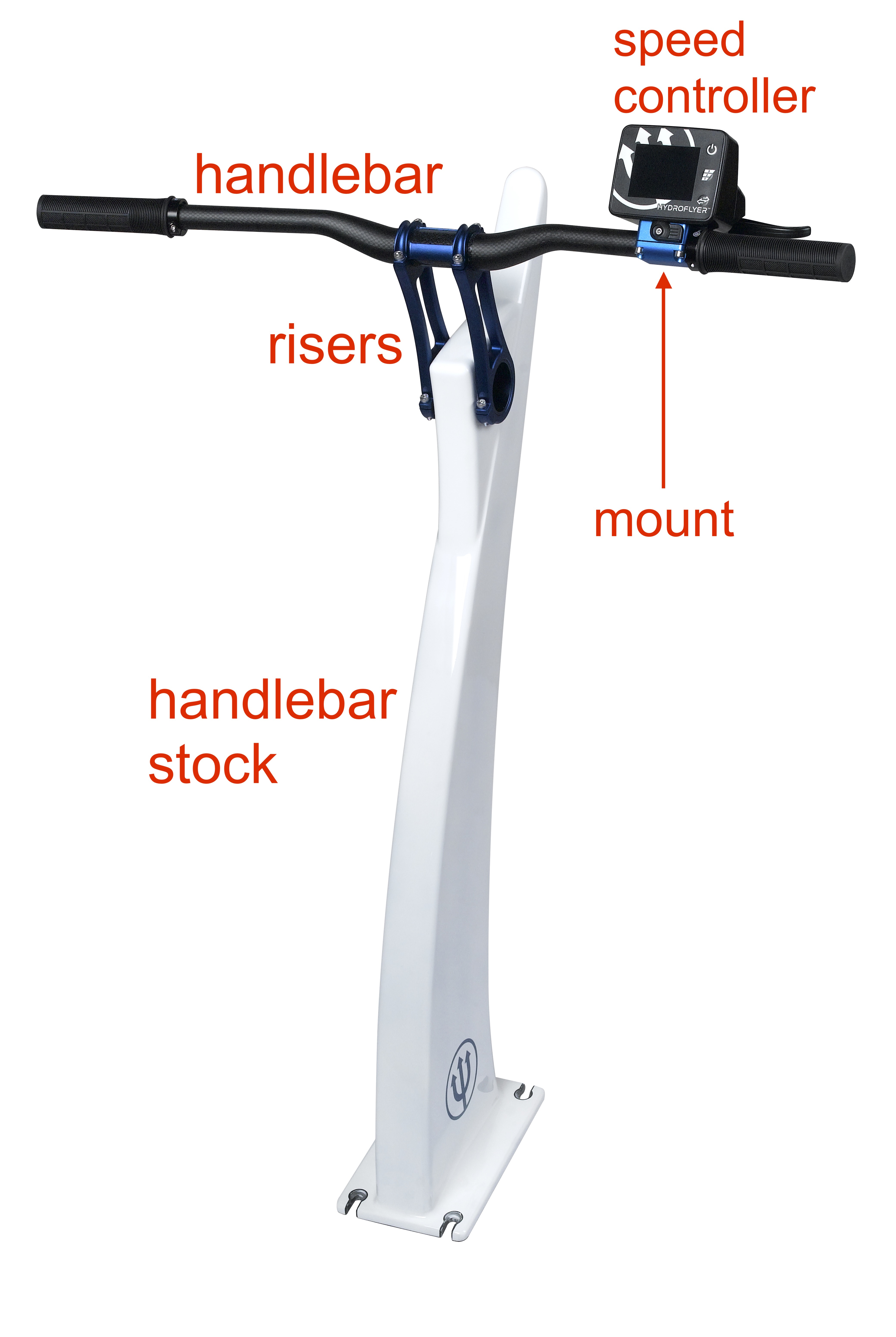
Hydroflyer Handlebar Assembly

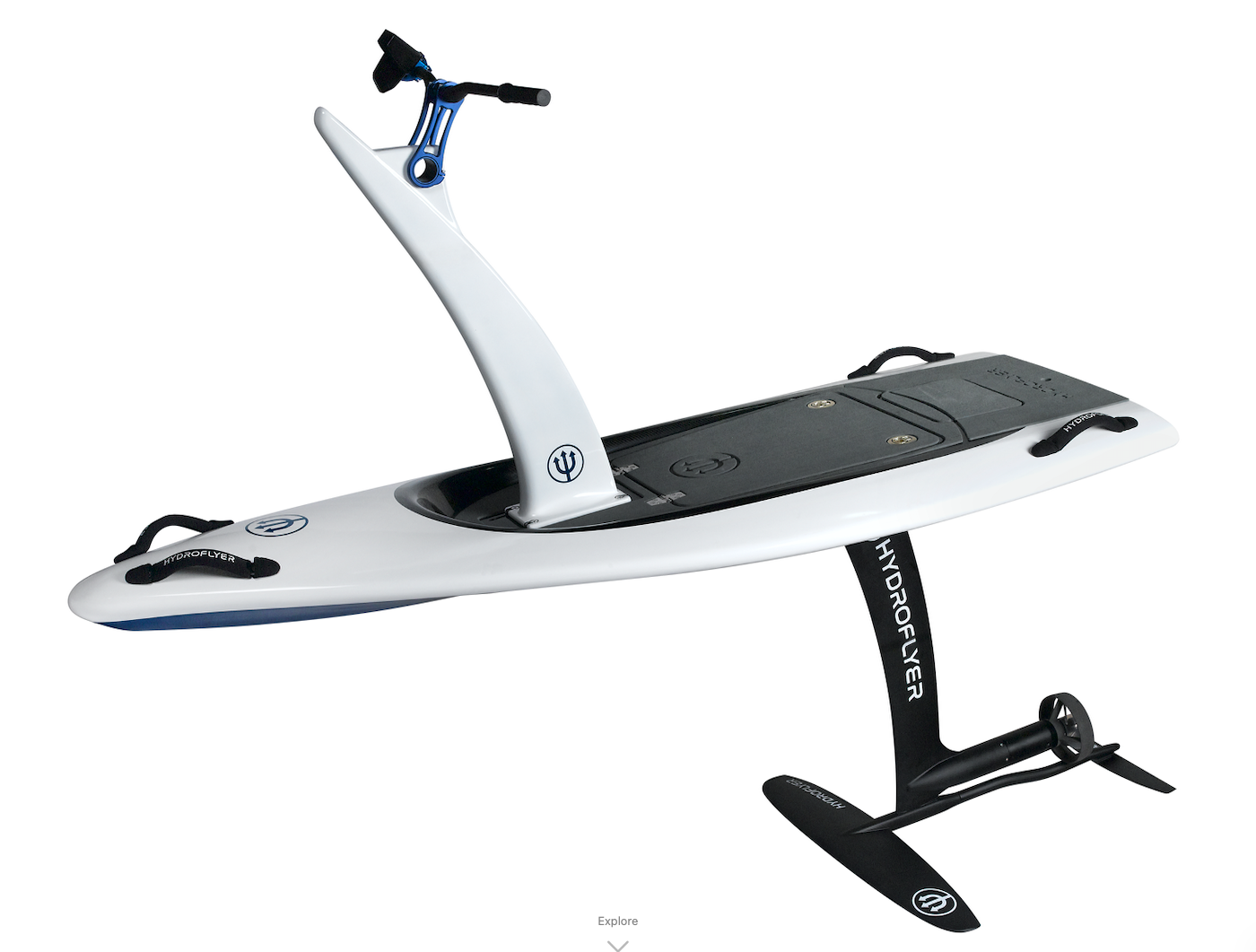
Hydroflyer Cruiser board

The Hydroflyer uses a carbon-fibre board and keel with a submerged electric propeller powered by a lithium-ion battery. A wireless throttle on the handlebars controls acceleration and speed. At roughly 4 kn (7.4 km/h), the foil begins to lift the craft above the water’s surface, reducing drag and noise.

The Hydroflyer Cruiser can reach speeds of up to 55 km/h (34 mph) and operates for approximately two hours per charge. The full system weight, including the battery, is 49.5 kg (108 lb).

== Models ==
The first consumer version, the Cruiser, was followed by the Sport, a shorter, snub-nosed model with a smaller foil designed for sharper handling and higher agility. Pricing is listed as US$15,995, depending on configuration. Additional model variations, including a beginner-oriented inflatable version, have also been reported.

== Reception ==
Wired described the Hydroflyer as “the Mountain Bike of the Sea” and highlighted its stability and control during testing in San Francisco Bay. The Inertia wrote that the handlebars improve accessibility for new riders and described the product as confidence-inspiring and agile. Robb Report included Hydroflyer in a feature on electric hydrofoils, noting its wide platform, handlebar control, and quoted top speed of 34 mph. Reviews in Electrek and Autoevolution described the design as combining elements of hydrofoil boards and personal watercraft, with the aim of reducing the learning curve for beginners.

== See also ==
- Foilboard
- Personal watercraft
- Hydrofoil
