= INPADOC =

INPADOC, which stands for International Patent Documentation, (Note: Prior to 2014, it was the International Patent Documentation Center.) is a freely available international patent database. It is produced and maintained by the European Patent Office (EPO). INPADOC developed a patent families classification, which groups together patent applications (and issued patents) originating from the same priority document(s). It also provides data about the legal status (pending, issued, abandoned, expired) for patent documents in many countries and for large time periods. Although INPADOC is not comprehensive, it keeps expanding the breadth and the depth of its coverage.

== Historic timeline ==
INPADOC was founded by the World Intellectual Property Organization (WIPO) and the government of Austria under an agreement on May 2, 1972. The original database was offered to users in microfiche format. Patent Family Service (PFS) grouping was introduced, where all the documents belonging to a specific patent family were identified, in 1973. Legal status information became available in 1978. INPADOC went on-line 1981.

In 1988 INPADOC officials claimed, that the database "covers more than 98 % of all patent documents published yearly worldwide and the total number of documents is more than 13 million." Luxembourg had the largest temporal coverage going back to 1945. The database provided bibliographic information from 55 patent issuing authorities (73 in 2023) and the legal status service from 12 as of 1990.

INPADOC was integrated into the European Patent Office (EPO) in 1991 with the Principal Directorate Patent Information of the EPO having been located in Vienna, Austria since. In 2003 the backlog of the legal status database was cleared up, and the physical storage of electronic records was established in The Hague.

Approximately 130,000 bibliographic records from Indonesia, Malaysia, the Philippines, Vietnam, Singapore and Brunei covering years between 1990 and 2003 were added in 1991, albeit their availability was initially limited to CD-ROM format only. Patent data from Brazil and 19 Spanish-language countries were added in 2004.

In 2005, the database provided bibliographic information from 73 patent issuing authorities and the legal status service from 44. Also in 2005, several commercial database developers (e.g. Anacubis, Minesoft, PatentInformatics and Questel-Orbit) offered access to enhanced INPADOC data and search functionality for a fee.

== See also ==
- Espacenet
- International Patent Classification
- Patent classification
- Derwent World Patents Index
- FIZ Karlsruhe
- Intellectual property analytics
- Patentscope
