= EndNote Click =

Technology company which aims to enable easy access to journal articles

EndNote Click (formerly Kopernio) is a freely available plugin allowing researchers to access papers in subscription-based scientific journals, to which they are subscribed through their higher education libraries, even when the user is off-campus. The tool works by recording the institutional subscriptions each user has and searches for full-text versions of selected papers to which the user may have access.

== Kopernio ==
Kopernio (now EndNote Click)
- Industry: Research
- Founded: 2016; 10 years ago
- Headquarters: London, United Kingdom
- Area served: Worldwide
- Owners: Part of Clarivate Analytics: Public company (NYSE: CCC, CCC.WS)
- Website: kopernio.com

The tool was created by the tech startup Kopernio, which was founded in 2017 by Mendeley co-founder Jan Reichelt and Newsflo co-founder Ben Kaube. The startup was acquired by Clarivate Analytics in April 2018 for £3.5 million, whereupon Reichelt became managing director for the Web of Science and Kaube became Kopernio's managing director. Clarivate intends to incorporate the Kopernio tool into Web of Science.
