= German Patent Classification =

The German Patent Classification is a patent classification system that was used in several European countries.

== History ==
The German Patent Office (German: Kaiserliches Patentamt) started developing a classification system for its patent documents in 1877. It was greatly expanded during the following decades and was published in seven editions between 1906 and 1958, first as "Verzeichnis der deutschen Patentklassen" and later as "Gruppeneinteilung der Patentklassen". The abbreviation DPK, for Deutsche Patentklassifikation, is used in some databases.

The DPK was also used in Sweden, Norway, and other countries in Scandinavia and central and eastern Europe. In the 1970s, development and active use of the system publications was discontinued as most of these countries switched to the International Patent Classification (IPC). The classification is still used on old patent documents.

Between the editions, modifications were published in the form of "Änderungen" (German for "modifications") and "Ergänzungslieferungen" (German for "updates"). Between 1958 and 1975 around 40 percent of the original groups were replaced with groups from the emerging IPC. These new IPC-based parts mainly used the IPC group numbering, but kept the original DPK subclass symbols.
