= Baidu Patents =

Chinese search service

Baidu Patents, or Baidu Zhuanli (Chinese: 百度专利) is a Chinese free online patent search service, launched on 1 January 2008.

== Overview ==
The Baidu Patents search engine is the result of a collaboration between the China Patent Information Center (CPIC), the Chinese Patent Office (SIPO) and Baidu.

Baidu Patent Search is said to be integrated with a patent database which amounts to 2.7 million Chinese patents.

== See also ==
- Google Patents
- Software industry in China
- China Software Industry Association
