= Clarivate =

American analytics company

Clarivate Plc

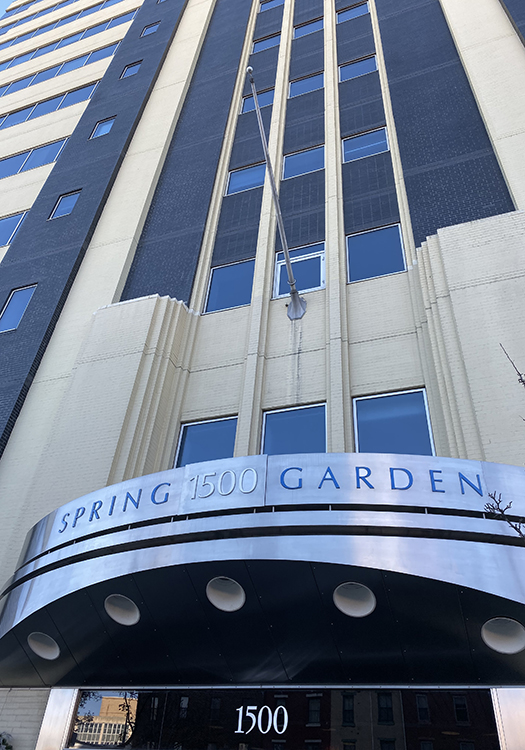
- Clarivate regional office at 1500 Spring Garden Street in Philadelphia
- Formerly: Clarivate Analytics
- Type: Public
- Traded as: NYSE: CLVT; Russell 2000 component
- Predecessor: The Intellectual Property and Science business of Thomson Reuters
- Founded: October 3, 2016; 10 years ago
- Headquarters: Philadelphia, United States; London, United Kingdom
- Key people: Matti Shem Tov
- Services: Web of Science; EndNote; Journal Citation Reports; Derwent
- Revenue: ▲US$2.66 billion (2022)
- Operating income: ▼ –US$3.9 billion (2022)
- Net income: ▼ –US$4.0 billion (2022)
- Total assets: ▼US$13.9 billion (2022)
- Total equity: ▼US$6.81 billion (2022)
- Number of employees: 11,600 (2022)
- Subsidiaries: ProQuest
- Website: clarivate.com

Clarivate Plc (Clarivate) is a British-American publicly traded analytics company operating a collection of subscription-based services in the areas of bibliometrics and scientometrics, business and market intelligence, and competitive profiling for pharmacy and biotech, patents, regulatory compliance, trademark protection, and domain and brand protection. Clarivate calculates the impact factor of scientific journals using data from its family of Web of Science products, including services and applications such as Publons, EndNote, and EndNote Click. Clarivate's other product families are Cortellis, Decision Resources Group (DRG), CPA Global, Derwent, CompuMark, Darts-ip, and ProQuest.

Clarivate formed in 2016, following the acquisition of Thomson Reuters' Intellectual Property and Science business by Onex Corporation and Baring Private Equity Asia. Since 2016, Clarivate acquired various companies, notably ProQuest in 2021.

== Company history ==
On July 11, 2016, Thomson Reuters a $3.55 billion sale of its Intellectual Property and Science business to private equity firms Onex Corporation and Baring Private Equity Asia. The transaction was completed on October 4, 2016, and Clarivate Analytics became an independent company as a corporate spin-off.

In May 2019, Clarivate merged with the Churchill Capital Corp SPAC to obtain a public listing on the New York Stock Exchange (NYSE), trading under symbol CLVT.

On March 11, 2022, Clarivate, which has an office in Odesa, Ukraine, announced it would cease all commercial activity in Russia following Russia's full-scale invasion of Ukraine on February 22, 2022.

=== Operations ===
As of 2023, Clarivate conducts operations through three strategic business units: Intellectual Property Group, Life Sciences & Healthcare Group, and Academic and Government Group, each led by a president.

Clarivate has been criticized for anti-competitive practices in an already oligopolistic academic database market for increasing prices of acquired products, a lack of development and integration of acquired products, not developing its own products, outsourcing jobs from the US and UK to India, and for eliminating telephone support for many acquired products.

=== Leadership Changes ===
On July 11, 2022, Clarivate announced Jerre Stead's retirement and transition from Executive Chair and CEO to Non-Executive Chair. IHS Markit CFO Jonathan Gear joined Clarivate as CEO-elect on July 11, 2022, becoming CEO on September 1, 2022.

On September 1, 2022, Clarivate announced Jerre Stead's retirement from the Board and appointment as Chair Emeritus effective October 20, 2022. On August 6, 2024, Clarivate appointed former ProQuest CEO Matti Shem Tov as CEO.

=== Acquisitions ===
- June 1, 2017: Publons, a platform for researchers to share recognition for peer review.
- April 10, 2018: Kopernio, AI startup providing capability to search for full-text versions of selected scientific journal articles.
- October 30, 2018: TrademarkVision, provider of Artificial Intelligence (AI) trademark research applications.
- September 9, 2019: SequenceBase, provider of patent sequence information and search technology for biotech, pharmaceutical, and chemical industries.
- December 2, 2019: Darts-ip, provider of case law data and analytics for intellectual property (IP) professionals.
- January 17, 2020: Decision Resources Group (DRG), a leading healthcare research and consulting company, providing high-value healthcare industry analysis and insights.
- June 22, 2020: CustomersFirst Now, provider of intellectual property (IP) software and tech-enabled services.
- October 1, 2020: CPA Global, intellectual property (IP) software and tech-enabled services provider.
- December 1, 2021: ProQuest, a software and data analytics provider to national academic and research institutions.
- March 21, 2024: MotionHall, a Silicon Valley start-up serving the life sciences with industry vertical AI solutions.
- April 23, 2024: Global QMS, Inc., expanding Clarivate's Life Sciences & Healthcare segment into new markets.
- July 22, 2024: Rowan TELS, enhancing support for patent practitioners.

=== Divestments ===
- November 2020: Techstreet, to a subsidiary of American Society of Mechanical Engineers.
- November 2022: MarkMonitor to Newfold Digital. MarkMonitor provided domain management, brand protection, anti-piracy, and anti-fraud services, and served as domain registrar for Google, Microsoft, Amazon, Tencent, YouTube, Wikipedia, and eBay.
- April 2024: Valipat.
- November 12, 2024: ScholarOne to Silverchair.

== Products and services ==
=== Web of Science ===
The Web of Science (WoS; previously known as Web of Knowledge) is a paid-access platform that provides (typically via the internet) access to multiple databases that provide reference and citation data from academic journals, conference proceedings, and other documents in various academic disciplines.

The Web of Science Core Collection consists of six online indexing databases:

- Science Citation Index Expanded (SCIE), previously entitled Science Citation Index, covers more than 9,200 journals across 178 scientific disciplines. Coverage is from 1900 to present day, with over 53 million records
- Social Sciences Citation Index (SSCI) covers more than 3,400 journals in the social sciences. Coverage is from 1900 to present, with over 9.3 million records
- Arts & Humanities Citation Index (AHCI) covers more than 1,800 journals in the arts and humanities. Coverage is from 1975 to present, with over 4.9 million records
- Emerging Sources Citation Index (ESCI) covers more than 7,800 journals in all disciplines. Coverage is from 2005 to present, with over 3 million records
- Book Citation Index (BCI) covers more than 116,000 editorially selected books. Coverage is from 2005 to present, with over 53.2 million records
- Conference Proceedings Citation Index (CPCI) covers more than 205,000 conference proceedings. Coverage is from 1990 to present, with over 70.1 million records

=== ProQuest ===
As Clarivate acquired ProQuest, various products of ProQuest are being operated under Clarivate, which encompasses products that ProQuest had taken on relatively recently, through acquisitions of its own—notably those of the library technology company Innovative Interfaces: Vega, Sierra, Polaris, Millennium, and Virtua.

==== Ex Libris Group ====
Ex Libris Group is a software company specialising in the development of integrated library systems and associated library software. In 2015, the company was acquired by ProQuest, which was subsequently acquired by Clarivate in December 2021.

=== Cortellis ===
Cortellis comprises life science related intelligence services used to inform decision making across the drug and device development lifecycle, including:

- Cortellis Clinical Trials Intelligence
- Cortellis Competitive Intelligence
- Cortellis Deals Intelligence
- Cortellis Digital Health Intelligence
- Cortellis Drug Discovery Intelligence
- Cortellis Generics Intelligence (formerly Newport)
- Cortellis Regulatory Intelligence
- Chemistry, Manufacturing and Controls (CMC) Intelligence
- BioWorld
- MetaCore

=== Derwent ===
The Derwent World Patents Index (DWPI) is a database containing patent applications and grants from 44 of the world's patent issuing authorities.

Other database products and services used for searching and analyzing patents; IP administration and prosecution support services to support the IP lifecycle include:

- Derwent Innovation
- Derwent SequenceBase
- Derwent Data Analyzer
- GENESEQ

=== CompuMark ===
Information services used by brand and trademark professionals to evaluate new potential trademarks and monitor existing trademarks for infringement, including:

- SAEGIS, online trademark screening
- TM go365, self-service trademark research application
- Full Search, analyst driven trademark searching
- Watching, trademark protection

=== ScholarOne ===
ScholarOne is a submission management system to allow an editor of an academic journal to manage electronic submission of authors' manuscripts for publication, to recruit reviewers of those manuscripts, to check authors' compliance with the journal's requirements, and to communicate with authors. It was sold to the American software company Silverchair in 2024.

== Annual lists and reports ==
=== Highly Cited Researchers ===
Clarivate publishes an annual Highly Cited Researchers list. The list compiles "the world's most influential researchers of the past decade, demonstrated by the production of multiple highly-cited papers that rank in the top 1% by citations for field and year in Web of Science." According to Clarivate, researchers are selected for their "exceptional performance" in one or more of 21 fields (those used in Clarivate Essential Science Indicators, or ESI) or across several fields. The 2019 list of Highly Cited Researchers was released on November 19, 2019.

=== Clarivate Citation Laureates ===
Clarivate Citation Laureates, formerly Thomson Reuters Citation Laureates, is a list of candidates considered likely to win the Nobel Prize in their respective field. The candidates are so named based on the citation impact of their published research. Thomson Reuters Citation Laureates was established in 1989. The list pertains to likely Nobel Prize winners in medicine, chemistry, physics, and economics. There appears to be a correlation between high citation rates for a published researcher and the award of prestigious accolades. Furthermore, citation rates disclose researchers furnishing instrumental contributions that advance the science of their respective field. Finally, choosing one tenth of one percent (0.1%) of the highest impact papers winnows the analysis to the topics and people most likely to be selected by Nobel selection committee.

From 2002 to 2020, 59 individuals listed as Citation Laureates have received Nobel prizes.

=== Journal Citation Reports ===
Journal Citation Reports (JCR) is an annual publication by Clarivate. It has been integrated with the Web of Science and is accessed from the Web of Science Core Collection. It provides information about academic journals in the natural and social sciences, including impact factors. JCR was originally published as a part of the Science Citation Index. Into the 21st century, the JCR, as a distinct service, is based on citations compiled from the Science Citation Index Expanded and the Social Sciences Citation Index. As of the 2023 edition, journals from the Arts and Humanities Citation Index and the Emerging Sources Citation Index have also been included.

=== Top 100 Global Innovators Report ===
The annual Top 100 Global Innovators report identifies the world's most innovative organizations. These businesses have successfully developed valuable patented inventions that also have strong commercialization potential based on market reach and impact on other downstream inventions. The 2020 Top 100 Global Innovators Report was released on February 19, 2020.

== See also ==
- List of academic databases and search engines
- Truven Health Analytics, another analytics company spun off from the Science and Healthcare unit of Thomson Reuters, later acquired by IBM
- RELX, a company that operates Scopus, which competes with WoS
