= SequenceBase =

SequenceBase Corporation
- Formation: 2006
- Headquarters: Edison, NJ, USA
- Location: USA
- Official language: English
- CEO: Martin Goffman
- Website: http://www.sequencebase.com/

SequenceBase was founded in 2006 as an international patent sequence information provider based in Edison, New Jersey. The company was acquired by Clarivate on 9th September 2019, and its technologies—such as the SequenceBase Research Portal and USGENE database—have since been integrated into Clarivate's Derwent Sequence Search and life sciences intellectual property offerings.

USGENE was previewed in 2006, launched on STN in 2007, and subsequently implemented alongside Clarivate's GENESEQ within the SequenceBase Research Portal. The database provides access to all available peptide and nucleotide sequences from the published applications and issued patents of the United States Patent and Trademark Office (USPTO). USGENE is searchable on STN and via Clarivate's Derwent Sequence Search.

On 5th May 2025, Martin Goffman and Robert Austin were awarded the Patent Information Users Group (PIUG) Technical Achievement Award for the development and commercialization of USGENE and the SequenceBase Research Portal.
