= Submission management =

Collection and management of submissions

Submission management is the art and science of collecting and managing any kind of submissions. Traditionally, submissions were collected offline, i.e. in the form of 'hard' paper files or folders. However, with the recent penetration of Internet in almost every sphere of life, there has been a steady shift towards collecting electronic submissions as compared to hard copies of submissions. The Internet has also facilitated a change in the perception towards the deliverables or contents of a submission. As a result of this, submitting audio and video files, pictures and presentations in addition to standard text, word and pdf-like documents has become common in the last few years.

Managing submissions may include evaluating submissions and providing feedback to submitters, accepting or rejecting submissions or requesting submitters to make a re-submission. In some cases, a panel of experts may also be requested to assist in the evaluation of submissions by reviewing or judging them.

== Common scenarios ==
=== Academics ===
It is a common practice for teachers, professors and teaching assistants to get assignments and projects submitted by students, either electronically or otherwise. These assignments are graded and the students are given feedback on whatever they submitted and how can they improve it. In institutes where academic submissions are done electronically, there generally is a system (usually a web-based one) in place to assist in the collection and management of submissions.

=== Call-for-paper (academic) conferences ===
In call-for-paper or academic conferences, prospective presenters are usually asked to submit a short abstract of their presentation or research work, which is reviewed before being accepted for the conference. Some conferences require researchers to submit a full paper of about 6–15 pages, which is peer reviewed by members of the conference's program committee and/or external reviewers chosen by them.

=== Competitions and contests ===
Most competitions and contests held world over usually have an initial screening round in which they accept nominations or entries from prospective participants. After all the nominations and entries have been received, the organizers of the competition or contest evaluate and shortlist the required number of entries on the basis of certain parameters set by them, notify the participants whose entries have been shortlisted and invite them to participate in further rounds of the competition or contest. Those whose entries were not shortlisted may also be given feedback by the organizers with a reason for the rejection and tips for improvement.

=== College events and fests ===
Student bodies in colleges and universities usually organize various inter-college and intra-college events and fests on an annual and/or semester basis. These events and fests are usually made up of several big and small competitions and contests, each of which generally follow a procedure as explained in the paragraph above.

=== Pharmaceuticals industry ===
Regulatory submissions in the pharmaceutical–biotechnology and medical device industry comprise documents and data that are submitted to a regulatory agency to gain approval to market new drugs, biologics and devices but also when modifications are introduced in registered data (variations). The documentation represents years of research and includes multi-disciplinary information (including preclinical and clinical data) regarding the safety and efficacy of a compound. The regulatory process varies from country to country and involves numerous interactions between the submitting company (sponsor) and the regulatory authority (agency). Many regulatory agencies accept electronic submissions in conjunction with or in lieu of submitting paper.

=== Human resources ===
Human resource departments collect résumés and CVs as a part of processing job applications. Applicants submit their résumés either via email, on the website of their prospective employer or on employment websites that help connect job seekers and employers.

=== Contemporary art ===
In contemporary art, curators often select and interpret works of art created by various artists. Before the popularity of the Internet, this was often done in person but these days some curators prefer artists submitting pictures of their work over email or by other electronic means for an initial screening. If the curator likes a particular work of art, he may electronically communicate his desire to work with the artist after verifying that the picture is indeed of his work.

=== The fashion industry ===
Models create and maintain portfolios which they use to showcase themselves during the process of getting selected for various fashion shows, advertisements and other events in the fashion industry. Those who are responsible for taking a decision on which models to choose usually ask prospective models to submit their portfolios with them. They take their decision after evaluating all the portfolios available with them.

=== Publication and media houses ===
Journalists and writers (full-time as well as freelancers) usually submit their articles and reports to editors of magazines, journals, newspapers and news channels who then select which ones will be published and/or telecasted and which ones won't be. At times, editors even provide feedback to the authors of reports with an intention of seeking pre-publication improvement.

=== Government applications ===
Most government procedures demand the filling up of a form, either electronically or on paper. Citizens submit their forms to the desired government agency by their preferred mode of communication after which the agency performs an initial verification during which they may contact the concerned person for further information, data or correction of errors. After the verification stage, the forms are marked for processing and the concerned person is intimated once the processing is over. The processing stage may involve external or sister agencies too.

== Challenges ==
=== Submission standards and formats ===
As companies, agencies and institutes move towards electronic submissions, a lot of complexity has been added in the submission management domain. In the paper world, much of the effort of managing a submission involves printing and collating volumes of information but with electronic submissions, it becomes increasingly difficult to efficiently manage the tens and thousands of submissions coming from different sources, in different formats at different times. As a result, many agencies are in the process of trying to implement global standards for submission formats and standards.

One example of this is the standards put forth by the International Conference on Harmonization (ICH) in the context of the pharmaceuticals industry. The ICH has developed the electronic Common Technical Document (eCTD) to promote harmonization of regulatory submissions in electronic format across various regions (United States, Europe and Japan).

=== Inappropriate modes and lack of automated systems ===
Email is by-far the most popular mode for collecting and managing electronic submissions and post for paper submissions. Since, both these processes are manual to quite an extent, they often lead to delays, inconsistencies and mishaps. In some setups, there are tailor-made systems that help collectors of submissions to some extent but they often fail owing to their ultra specific nature.

The key to successful submission management involves tracking each submission as well as all its versions and sub-parts that may be related to it or dependent on it. In addition to planning and tracking submission content, it is also important to manage and allocate resources effectively based on workload, skill sets and availability. Submission collectors may seek the help of expert reviewers or judges in such cases. All these reasons have motivated many companies and researchers to begin looking at submission management as a formal discipline and to start analyzing metrics behind various submission processes.

== Submission management systems ==
Certain software vendors have begun developing submission management systems to assist submission collectors in the automation, tracking and management of complex submission processes. Most of these systems are web based and accessible from any device with a browser and an Internet connection. However, a majority of these systems are application specific and cannot be applied to all submission management scenarios. This means that a lot of work needs to be done in this field before we have good and reliable submission management systems that are suitable and usable in every context of submission management.
