= Patent family =

A patent family is a set of patents or patent applications in various countries in relation to a single invention, for example when a first application in a country – the priority application – is extended to other countries. In other words, a patent family is "the same invention disclosed by a common inventor(s) and patented in more than one country." Patent families can be regarded as a "fortuitous by-product of the concept of priorities for patent applications".

== Definitions ==
The International Patent Documentation Centre (INPADOC), the European Patent Office (EPO) and WIPO recognize the following definitions of simple and extended patent families:

Simple patent family: All patent documents have exactly the same priority date or combination of priority dates.

Extended patent family: All patent documents are linked (directly or indirectly) via a priority document belonging to one patent family. The extended families allow for additional connectors to link other than strictly priority date. These include: domestic application numbers, countries that have not ratified the Paris Convention, or if the application was filed too late to claim priority.

Those are not the only possible definitions of a patent family, however. Another definition, which is broader than the "simple patent family" definition but narrower than the "extended patent family" definition, is to consider that "[a]ll the documents having at least one common priority belong to the same patent family."

In general, "[p]atent families are [effectively] defined by databases, not by national or international laws, and family members for a particular invention can vary from database to database."

== See also ==
- Continuing patent application
- Derwent World Patents Index patent family database
- Global Dossier
- INPADOC patent family database
- Triadic patent
