= Patent Information News =

Patent Information News was a trilingual, quarterly magazine published by the Principal Directorate Patent Information of the European Patent Office (EPO), Vienna sub-office, Austria.

== History and profile ==
Patent Information News was launched in the early 1990s. At that time, it was known as EPIDOS news, and the name Patent Information News was apparently adopted in 2006. It was published in English, German and French, the three official languages of the EPO. It often contained articles about the online search service Espacenet, patent documentation and search strategies. In late 2019, Patent Information News ceased publication and Patent Knowledge News took its role.

== See also ==
- List of intellectual property law journals
