= Submission management system =

Software streamlining the submission of electronic information

A submission management system is a software system, also known as submission processing, that streamlines and eases out the collection, tracking and management of electronic submissions. Information can be received, authenticated, tracked, stored, and distributed electronically. Submission management systems can be web-based system operating in a browser environment, a COTS based product, or may also be in the form of a desktop application. Submissions are completed electronically, creating an efficient real-time process that saves time for both the submitter and recipient. Usually a submission management system can take in a high volume of data at a fast rate.

A submission management system may be regarded as an application-specific content management system. In essence, such a system can be used in many situations as an alternative to email.

== Common Features ==
Although submission management systems can get pretty complex, there are some features that a submission management system must provide in order for it to be classified under that category. Here is a list of some of those features:

1. Provision to provide a start time and an end time for collecting submissions
2. Mechanism for collection and storage of electronic submissions
3. Mechanism for downloading and viewing the collected submissions only to authorized people at any given time
4. Mechanism to verify that all documents and attachments are virus free
5. Mechanism to guarantee that all the required information is present for submission
6. Mechanism for accepting and rejecting submissions
7. Provision for giving relevant feedback to submitters
8. Provision for requesting the resubmission of submissions
9. Mechanism for submitters to view submissions made by them and associated comments

== Common Applications ==
Each of these applications encompass the entire work-flow and all common features of typical submission management systems.

=== Course Management ===
Course management systems are used in colleges and universities to collect and manage course assignments and projects in electronic formats.

=== Conference Management ===
Call-for-paper conferences use conference management systems to collect, review and shortlist research papers and then notify the authors whose papers are shortlisted for publication and presentation.

=== Electronic Government Application Management ===
Whether at the federal, state, or local level, government procedures often demand the filing of forms whether electronically or on paper. Submission management systems can provide a tool for electronic submissions to the Government.

=== Resume Management and Recruitment Management ===
Employment websites and job sites collect electronic versions of resumes and help recruiters connect with job seekers in a streamlined fashion.

=== Event and Competition Management ===
Several events and competitions have an online round for shortlisting and selecting participants and attendees. The organizers of such events use event management systems with a functionality to collect and manage electronic submissions.

=== Online Survey Management ===
Systems allow users to create online surveys, collect responses from people over the Internet and view the results in various formats including graphs. These systems are essentially variants of submission management systems.

=== Manuscript Submission Management ===
Manuscript submission management systems allow the editors of an academic journal to manage the electronic submissions of authors' manuscripts for publication, to recruit reviewers of those manuscripts, to check authors' compliance with the journal's requirements, and to communicate with authors. Example of such systems are Clarivate's ScholarOne., Submit A Manuscript (SAM), Conference Submission Management, etc. These are designed to be very flexible and powerful submission management systems to manage the complete editorial workflow of a submission.

== Generic Systems ==
Generic submission management systems are not built specifically to suit one submission management application or scenario. Rather, they allow users to collect and manage submissions across multiple applications and scenarios. Though such systems exist, they are comparatively less in number as compared to application-specific ones.

== Resistance to Submission Management Systems ==
Widespread adoption and use of submission management systems (esp. in academia) has been hampered by several factors that include but are not limited to:

- Inconvenience while drawing figures, diagrams and equations on a computer
- Resistance to change and adopt new technologies
- Lack of or limited access to the Internet
- Strict adherence to submission deadlines
- Extra effort in using submission management systems as compared to traditional modes like email
- Lack of trust in web-based submission management systems
- Steep learning curve
