= Office action =

Correspondence in patent proceedings

In the United States, an Office action is a document written by an examiner in a patent or trademark examination procedure and mailed to an applicant for a patent or trademark. The expression is used in many jurisdictions.

Formally, the "O" is supposed to be capitalized, since it refers to the U.S. Patent and Trademark Office.

== United States ==
=== Trademark law ===
In United States trademark law, an Office action is issued by an examiner for the United States Patent and Trademark Office (USPTO), rejecting an application to register a trademark. An Office action typically includes one or both of two elements. The first possible element is the category of "informalities", matters such as an inadequate sample to show use of the mark, providing insufficient information with respect to the nature of the entity seeking the mark (for example, failing to name the partners in a partnership), or providing insufficient information for the examiner to determine what, exactly, the goods and services provided by the applicant are.

The second possible element of an Office action is an actual basis for rejection of the mark itself. The most frequent bases are likelihood of confusion with an existing registered mark and genericness or descriptiveness of the mark for which registration is sought. Rarely, a mark will be rejected as "immoral or scandalous", usually if it contains sexually suggestive terms, or vulgarities, for example the rejection of a logo with a defecating dog in Greyhound Corp. v. Both Worlds, Inc., 6 U.S.P.Q.2d 1635.

When an Office action is issued, the applicant has three months to respond to the Examiner with possibility of being extended for an equal period. If the Office action was issued with respect to "informalities", the response may simply be the correction of these matters by providing additional information. If the action is premised on a defect in the mark itself, such as likelihood of confusion, genericness, or descriptiveness, the applicant may need to present evidence and legal argument to overcome this rejection. If the Examiner is not convinced by the evidence submitted, a final Office action will issue. This may be appealed to the Trademark Trial and Appeal Board. A final Office action is also known as a filing refusal.

=== Patent law ===
In United States patent law, an Office action is a document written by a patent examiner in response to a patent application after the examiner has examined the application. The Office action cites prior art and gives reasons why the examiner has allowed, or approved, the applicant's claims, and/or rejected the claims.

An Office action may be "final" or "non-final". In a non-final Office action, the applicant is entitled to reply and request reconsideration or further examination, with or without making an amendment. In a final Office action, the applicant has two options for reply. In the first option, the applicant may appeal rejection of claims to the Board of Patent Appeals and Interferences. Otherwise, the applicant may file an amendment which complies with the requirements set forth in the Office action. Reply to a final rejection must include cancellation of, or appeal from the rejection of, each rejected claim. If any claim stands allowed, the reply to a final rejection must comply with any requirements or objections as to form. Replies to final Office actions must be in accordance with 37 C.F.R. 1.113-1.114.

When an Office action is issued, the applicant may take up to six months to respond to the Examiner. Note that a shortened statutory period of between one and three months usually applies (justified by the USPTO's desire for speedy prosecution of applications) and responses sent later than the shortened period require the filing of a petition and the payment of a petition fee that varies with the number of additional months requested. Each additional month requires an increasingly higher fee. For example, when an Examiner sends a restriction requirement, a one-month shortened statutory period applies, and if the applicant sends a response on the 31st or 32nd day (depending on the month, as well as on Saturday/Sunday/holiday practice; note that February is granted 30 days), a petition for a one-month extension, and the associated fee, must accompany the response. Most other Office actions have shortened statutory periods of either two or three months. Note however that an applicant cannot petition for an extension of time beyond the six-month limit.

FAOM is an acronym used by the USPTO for "first action on the merits".

== See also ==
- Search report
- Manual of Patent Examining Procedure
