= Electronic submission =

Electronic submission refers to the submission of a document by electronic means: that is, via e-mail or a web form on the Internet, or on an electronic medium such as a compact disc, a hard disk or a USB flash drive. Traditionally, the term "manuscript" referred to anything that was explicitly "written by hand". However, in popular usage and especially in the context of computers and the internet, the term "manuscript" may even refer to documents (text or otherwise) typed out or prepared on typewriters and computers and can be extended to digital photographs and videos, and online surveys too. In other words, any manuscript prepared and submitted online can be considered to be an electronic submission.

== History and early usage ==
There is no concrete data indicating when and by whom were electronic submissions used for the first time. However, research based universities in several countries have been encouraging the collection of course assignments and projects in the form of electronic submissions for almost a decade now. Several governments and organizations are also switching to electronic submissions for the collection of research papers, grant applications and government application forms.

== Types of electronic submissions ==
Since modern computers can store and process information and data in virtually any format and with the Internet allowing easy transfer of this data, the number of scenarios in which submissions can be collected electronically has increased exponentially in the last few years. Some of these scenarios are described below. In most of these scenarios, submissions were collected on hard paper until the Information Technology revolution occurred.

=== Academic Submissions ===
Teachers, professors and teaching assistants often collect course assignments and projects electronically. Electronic submissions are usually collected using a web-based system which more often than not also helps in the management of submissions collected and stored on it. (Explained By Henny L, University of Lethbridge, AB, Canada)

=== Research Papers ===
In call-for-paper or academic conferences, prospective presenters are usually asked to submit a short abstract or a full paper on their presentation or research work electronically, which is reviewed before being accepted for the conference.

=== Proposals for Grants ===
Several grant-giving organizations like the NSA, W3C, NIA, NIH etc. require grant seekers to submit a proposal which if accepted result in the desired grants. A majority of these proposals are now submitted electronically on systems that also help in the managing and tracking the proposals submitted.

=== Articles for Publication ===
Magazines, newspapers and other publishing houses have begun accepting electronic submissions for articles from various sources - both internal (by journalists and writers hired by them) as well as external (by users and popular readers). The submitted articles are stored on a server hosted by the publication house or by a third-party vendor and are usually evaluated before being given a green signal.

=== Contests and Competition Entries ===
Almost every kind of contest or competition requires participants to submit an entry in a format described by the organizers of the contest. If the contest is an Internet-based one, then the entries or nominations for the contest are collected electronically using e-mail or other electronic means depending on feasibility and the choice of the organizers.

=== Government Applications ===
The governments of several countries are turning to electronic submission of applications and forms for various government procedures. Electronic submissions allow easier management of the applications and forms submitted.

=== Legal documents ===
Many legal documents may be submitted to the courts electronically. In England and Wales, the Civil Procedure Rules include a suitable "document exchange" as an acceptable "method of service". Case law in employment law cases has established that where a claim is submitted electronically, a prudent legal adviser should "check that it has been received and there must be systems in place for doing that".

=== Resumés and CVs ===
It has become commonplace for job-seekers to submit soft copies (electronic versions) of their resumés and CVs to recruiting agencies and online job portals. This is usually done over the Internet using e-mail or a pre-hosted web-based system.

== Submission management systems ==
The art and science of collecting and managing electronic submissions is called Submission Management. Certain software vendors have begun developing submission management systems to assist in the collection, tracking and management of complex submission processes realized electronically. Most of these systems are web based and accessible from any device with a browser and an Internet connection. However, a majority of these systems are application specific and cannot be applied to all submission management scenarios.

== Resistance to electronic submissions ==
Despite the easier management and tracking of electronic submissions compared to their paper-based counterparts, widespread adoption and use of electronic submissions and systems for managing them has been hampered by several facts, which include but are not limited to:

- Inconvenience while drawing figures, diagrams and equations on a computer
- Resistance to change and adoption of new technologies
- Lack of or limited access to the Internet.
