= Competitive landscape =

Business analysis method

Competitive landscape is a business analysis method that identifies direct or indirect competitors to help comprehend their mission, vision, core values, niche market, strengths, and weaknesses. Based on the volatile nature of the business world, where companies represent a competition to others, this analysis helps to establish a new mind-set which facilitates the creation of strategic competitiveness.

Due to the hypercompetition of the environment, the traditional sources of getting competitive advantage does not represent any more an effective strategy, as a result of the emergence of a global economy and technology. Consequently, this emergence is analyzed to develop intelligence for competitive analysis. Investment in strategic management is the foundation for business stability because it helps to develop the fundamental basis of the business and be competitive inside the market.

== Global economy ==
Global economy is one of the main aspects to consider before starting a competitive landscape profile, because it helps to understand the global economic activity where all the production factors such as people, knowledge, services, products move without limits. This factor is constantly transforming inside the business environment which leads companies to analyze the market where they compete. Even if it represents opportunities for the company, the differences in the legal, economic and political aspects between organizations from one country to other must be considered. The idea of a "global mindset" determines the acceptance of this organizational diversity in order to prepare for challenges.

== Technological change ==
Technology is considered inside the competitive environment because it represents a tool to acquire competitive advantages, as mentioned before. This technologies improve the efficiency and the productivity of companies because it helps to get new sources of growth. Technology is not only focused on economic growth, but also on the improvement of quality, service, knowledge and innovation and by this manner, in the improvement of development of companies. All the aspects inside the technological framework have been divided into three categories:

=== Technology diffusion ===
This aspect is referred to the speed at which technologies are globally available and used in other companies.

=== Information age ===
This aspect is focused on the access to information and its development through the decades.

=== Knowledge intensity ===
This aspect considers the transformation of knowledge into resources, the ones that help the company to increase their strategic flexibility.

== Competitive landscape profile ==
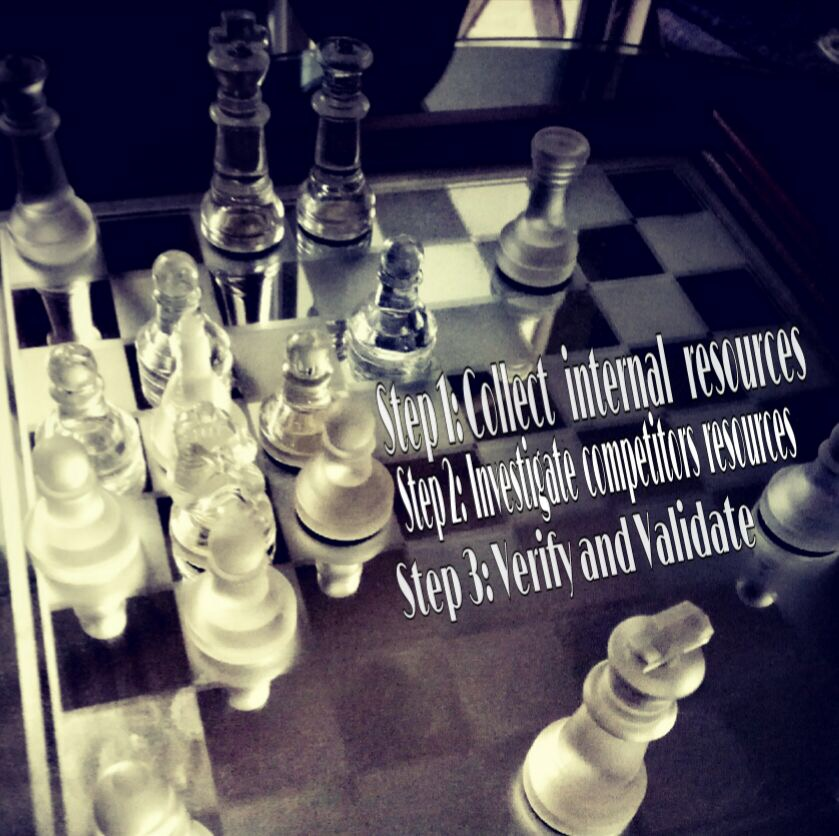
Competitive Landscape Profile Achievement

After companies consider the influence of global economy and technological changes in the strategic management process, they focus on the competitive landscape profile - a comparative analysis of products between two companies—to understand the strengths and weaknesses. Evaluating each competitor requires a strategic division according to level of competitiveness.

Porter's Five Forces are considered because, according to that analysis, Michael Porter establishes that competition depends on five specific factors: potential new entrants, internal rivalry, suppliers, buyers and substitutes. Unification of the analysis of the competition with the Porter's Five Forces creates a complete competitive profile which provides a detailed guide to company managers, because it identifies the company's advantages has over its—or, on the contrary, it helps generate decisions and solutions to apply in cases of similarities.

This competitive analysis takes place in three steps:

=== Step 1: collect internal resources ===
The company focuses on an internal aspect of the company and its competitors to comprehend the global aspect of competition. This helps the company analyze, through the Internet, company performance and also general keywords.

=== Step 2: investigate competitors' resources ===
Secondly, after understanding the general movements of the company, the analysis focuses on the research of specific aspects to compare with the personal company. This information defines the management process, the decision-making process and the organizational service.

=== Step 3: verify and validate ===
Finally, after collecting the general information and specifying some aspects, the analysis validates the veracity of the information found in the internet. It transforms itself from being an internet research into a personal investigation. In this aspect, companies use the technique of personal appointments with the competition to determine the real basis of competitive advantage.
