= European Patent Register =

The European Patent Register, also known as the Register of European Patents, is a public register kept by the European Patent Office (EPO). It contains legal information relating to published European patent applications and European patents granted under the European Patent Convention (EPC). The register notably provides the current legal status of European patent applications and patents, such as for instance "whether a patent application has been published, whether a patent has been granted, what the outcome of opposition proceedings was or whether a patent has been revoked".

The register does not, however, contain information regarding what happens to a European patent at the national level (especially after grant, when the European patent becomes effectively a bundle of national patents in the member states of the European Patent Organisation). Since October 2011 however, its records include deep links to the corresponding records of the European patents' "national parts" in about twenty national registers (as of December 2012). The Global Dossier is also available via the European Patent Register.

The European Patent Office is the only body that can perform legally effective publication and registration of European patent applications and patents. It regularly issues warnings about scams by firms and individuals that invite applicants to register patents in unofficial registers or publications. Such registration services are a well known scam in intellectual property.

== See also ==
- Patent Application Information Retrieval (PAIR), a similar service provided by the USPTO for U.S. patent applications and patents
