= Current Contents =

Rapid alerting service database

- Producer: Clarivate

Access
- Cost: Subscription

Coverage
- Record depth: index

Links
- Website: clarivate.com/products/scientific-and-academic-research/research-discovery-and-workflow-solutions/webofscience-platform/current-contents-connect/

Current Contents is a rapid alerting service database from Clarivate, formerly the Institute for Scientific Information and Thomson Reuters. It is published online and in several different printed subject sections.

== History ==
Current Contents was first published in paper format, in a single edition devoted only to biology and medicine. Other subject editions were added later. Initially, it consisted simply of a reproduction of the title pages from several hundred major peer-reviewed scientific journals, and was published weekly, with the issues containing title pages from journal issues only a few weeks previously, a shorter time lag than any service then available. There was an author index and a crude keyword subject index only. Author addresses were provided so readers could send reprint requests for copies of the actual articles.

== Status ==
Still published in print, it is available as one of the databases included in Clarivate Analytics' Web of Science with daily updates, and also through other database aggregators.

=== Editions ===
The following editions are published:

- Current Contents Agricultural, Biological, and Environmental Sciences
- Current Contents Arts and Humanities
- Current Contents Clinical Practice
- Current Contents Engineering, Technology, and Applied Sciences
- Current Contents Life Sciences
- Current Contents Physical Chemical and Earth Sciences
- Current Contents Social & Behavioral Sciences

== See also ==
- Google Scholar
- List of academic databases and search engines
