= DKP =

DKP can refer to:

== Media ==
- Currency in the simExchange video game
- Dragon kill points in online games
- DKP Studios, later Jam Filled Entertainment, a visual effects studio

== Political parties ==
- Danmarks Kommunistiske Parti, the Communist Party of Denmark
- Deutsche Kommunistische Partei, the German Communist Party
- Deutsche Konservative Partei, alternate name of the Deutsche Rechtspartei, former far-right political party in Germany
- Deutschkonservative Partei, the German Conservative Party, active in the German Empire
- Devrimci Komünarlar Partisi, Revolutionary Communard Party, Turkey

== Other uses ==
- Diketopiperazine, a class of organic compounds
  - 2,5-Diketopiperazine, a specific form
- Duffin–Kemmer–Petiau algebra, in quantum field theory
- Don King Productions
