= Patent map =

Graphical model of patent visualisation

A patent map is a graphical model of patent visualisation. This practice "enables companies to identify the patents in a particular technology space, verify the characteristics of these patents, and ... identify the relationships among them, to see if there are any zones of infringement." Patent mapping is also referred to as patent landscaping.

== See also ==
- Patent analysis
