= Patent analytics =

Patent analytics is the process of analyzing the patent documents, disclosures and other information (such as priority dates, filing and issuance countries, patent maintenance payments, patent citations, patent infringement actions etc.) from the patent lifecycle. Patent analytics is used to obtain deeper insights into different technologies and innovation. Other terms are sometimes used as synonyms for patent analytics, such as patent analysis, patent landscape, or patent mapping. Patent analytics encompasses the analysis of patent data, analysis of the scientific literature, data cleaning, text mining, machine learning, geographic mapping, and data visualisation.

Patent analytics is a specialized domain within intellectual property analytics. It is used in industry and explored by the public sector to take informed decisions related to prioritization and investments in R&D, IP portfolio management, and policymaking among others.

== Terminology ==
There is some conceptual blurring between terms patent analytics, patent analysis, patent landscape, or patent mapping.

A patent search relates to specific prior art or individual patent documents to answer micro-level questions about a single invention. It will be used for patentability checks, FTO assessments, invalidity challenges, and evidence-of-use studies.

Patent analysis or patent analytics is the broader analytical activity. It examines large sets of patent data to uncover broader macroeconomic and competitive trends. In practice, people often use the terms interchangeably, but they represent different levels of depth and scope. Patent analysis is more tactical and specific oriented whilst patent analytics is more strategic and broader level.

Patent landscape is a structured overview of patenting activity in a specific field.

== Applications and types of patent analyses ==
Different types of patent analyses can be performed based on the need and the questions to be answered and each type of analysis leads to different associated reports.

A patentability or prior art search report provides information on whether a new invention is eligible for patent protection, along with information on what are the closest prior arts. This analysis helps patent attorneys draft broad and appropriate claims for the new invention. The patentability search may include both patent and non-patent literature. A freedom-to-operate search report helps organizations decide if they have the clearance to launch a new product without infringing on anyone else's patent rights. This is specific to only one jurisdiction, and multiple searches for each jurisdiction may have to be performed if an organization is interested in obtaining clearance for product launch in different countries.

Patent landscape reports (PLRs) are another example of a report produced by performing patent analysis.

In the public sector, the providers of patent landscape reports are the national patent offices or research institutes that prepare reports on subjects of general interest, for a specific need, or to provide landscaping services to the public. Patent landscape reports are used by the public sector to raise awareness, with public institutions increasingly finding ways to facilitate and validate their policy decisions in ways that are similar to private sector decisions.

For users in industry, they are used as a decision-making mechanism (patent portfolio management, R&D investment and prioritisation, technology transfer, etc.). Such reports are typically confidential and not publicly available. They are costly and commissioned or developed to support specific decision-making processes and are considered business intelligence.

Patent landscape reports are sometimes confused with different products serving different purposes, such as a freedom-to-operate (FTO) analysis which has a different scope and is based on an FTO search; technology bulletins, technology watches/technology alerts, or even specific type of visualizations.

== Patent analysis methodology ==
A patent analysis starts with a set of questions: who is active in this technology ? how has the technology evolved ? where are the technological gaps ? what organizations are involved ? where are inventions being protected ? The search strategy relies for example a search with a combination of keywords, classifications, citations, assignees, inventors using patent databases. It is followed by data cleaning, for example to check duplicates: for example, the same company can appear under numerous names in patent records. The EPO explicitly discusses applicant-name harmonisation as a necessary step in patent analysis.

The analytical process in. patent analytics typically follows a structured methodology, as described in WIPO's guidelines for patent analytics.

In general, patent analytics and patent landscape report creation involves the following stages:

1. Defining the topic and project scope,
2. The patent search that leads to obtaining patent data,
3. Data cleaning and normalization,
4. Data analysis and visualization,
5. Interpretation and reporting, and
6. Dissemination and distribution of the analysis.

Patent analytics is an iterative process which often requires rescoping of the project and adaptation based on the findings during the process. There are different tools which can be used for analytics, some embedded in patent databases, others more general data manipulation, visualization and analytics tools, including commercial and open source tools.

Analytical techniques in patent studies include:

- Bibliometrics, including citation and co-invention analysis;
- Patent mapping, such as overlay maps, clustering, and heatmaps;
- Machine learning, using NLP for classification and topic modeling, with recent advances leveraging Large language models (LLMs) for prior art search, semantic analysis, and even the application of complex patent regulations,with deep learning methods specifically enhancing comprehensive prior art retrieval;
- Network analysis, visualizing collaborations, citation networks, and semantic relationships.

Typically patent analytics teams work with R&D departments, patent attorneys, with related information feeding into IP, corporate and business strategy decisions.

== Data sources and tools ==
Patent databases are used to retrieve/search individual records. Patent data can be accessed through open platforms such as WIPO's Patentscope, EPO's Espacenet, the USPTO bulk data portal, national patent office databases or Lens.

Statistical datasets are designed for large-scale quantitative analysis. For large-scale analysis, EPO’s PATSTAT specifically is a database for statistical analysis of worldwide patent data, and it supports linking patent information to harmonized applicant names, geographic information and sector classifications. It offers structured data exports compatible with statistical software. Other statistical datasets include OECD patent statistics and WIPO Statistics.

Analytical platefofms provide normalization, visualization, semantic search etc. Commercial platforms like Derwent Innovation, Orbit Intelligence, and Lens.org offer enhanced search, normalization, and visualization capabilities.

== Combining patents data with other sources ==
Patent data can be combined with other sources to provide additional context or enable analyses that cannot be performed using patent data alone. These sources can include: scientific publications, company and financial information, market data, standards, clinical-trial data, regulatory information etc. Recent research emphasizes integrating patent analytics with scientific publication data, market data, and standards to build multi-dimensional technology intelligence systems. Patent analytics also plays a critical role in sustainability assessments, pharmaceutical innovation, green technologies, and artificial intelligence trend monitoring, as evidenced by major reports on innovation in clean energy technologies, and through specific patent analyses leveraging AI to identify climate change mitigation trends. The field further offers critical insights into global trends in biotechnology innovation, often revealing significant growth and emerging frontiers in areas like genetic engineering and AI-integrated biotech tools.

== Limitations ==
Patent data is sometimes considered as direct proxy for innovation. But patent statistics do not directly measure innovation. Not all inventions are patented, and the propensity to patent varies between industries, organizations and countries. Patent counts may therefore reflect differences in patenting strategies as well as differences in technological activity. Some technologies are more likely to be patented than others. A large number of patent applications doesn't necessarily mean a large number of commercially significant inventions. Applicant names, inventors, classifications and legal-status information can also contain inconsistencies. A published application, granted patent, expired patent and abandoned application should not be treated as equivalent. Patent data reflect where applicants choose to seek protection, not necessarily where inventions are developed or products are manufactured.
