= Energy Science and Technology Database =

The Energy Science and Technology Database (EDB) is a multidisciplinary file containing worldwide references to basic and applied scientific and technical research literature. The information is collected for use by (United States) government managers, researchers at the national laboratories, and other research efforts sponsored by the U.S. Department of Energy, and the results of this research are transferred to the public. Abstracts are included for records from 1976 to the present day.

== Nuclear Science Abstracts ==
The EDB also contains the Nuclear Science Abstracts which is a comprehensive abstract and index collection to the international nuclear science and technology literature for the period 1948 through 1976. Included are scientific and technical reports of the US Atomic Energy Commission, United States Energy Research and Development Administration and its contractors, other agencies, universities, and industrial and research organizations. Approximately 25% of the records in the file contain abstracts. Nuclear Science Abstracts contains over 900,000 bibliographic records. In comparison, the entire Energy Science and Technology Database contains over 3 million bibliographic records.

== EDB Scope ==
Moreover, this database is designed to be a source for any individual who requires access to worldwide energy related information. This database is applicable to the following:

- Obtaining results of current energy research efforts.
- Access subject specific information on energy sources, use, and conservation; environmental effects; waste processing and disposal; regulatory consideration, as well as basic scientific studies.
- Review energy information from a wide variety of sources, including journal literature, conference, patents, books, monographs, theses, and engineering and software materials.
- Access historical records of the US Atomic Energy Commission, and US Energy Research and Development Administration.
- Review subject specific information on nuclear science from a wide variety of sources, including books, conference proceedings, papers, patents, dissertations, engineering drawings, and journal literature.

=== Subject coverage ===
Subject coverage includes:

- Biology
- Biomedicine
- Chemistry
- Coal, Gas, Oil, Hydroelectricity
- Conservation technology
- Energy Conversion
- Energy Policy
- Engineering
- Environmental Science
- Geosciences, Geothermal Energy
- Hazardous waste management
- Human Genome Project Methodology
- Isotope / Radiation technology
- Materials Handling
- Metals and Ceramics
- Renewable Energy Source
- Nuclear and Thermonuclear Power
- Physics
- Synthetic fuels

== Sources ==
A combination of national, and international agencies, as well as multiple non-governmental organizations are the source for, and provide information to, this database. Information is provided through the Energy Technology Data Exchange (ETDE), which is the International Energy Agency's (IEA) multilateral information program, and through the International Atomic Energy Agency's International Nuclear Information System (INIS), and IEA Coal Research. Other source information is provided by the U.S. Department of Energy, its contractors, other government agencies, professional societies. Engineering and software materials, references to journal literature, conferences, patents, books, monographs, and thesis, make up the files of this database. Approximately 50% of these references are from non-U.S. sources.

== See also ==
- List of academic databases and search engines
