= Derwent World Patents Index =

World patent database

The Derwent World Patents Index (DWPI) is a database containing patent applications and grants from 44 of the world's patent issuing authorities.

Compiled in English by editorial staff, the database provides a short abstract detailing the nature and use of the invention described in a patent and is indexed into alphanumeric technology categories to allow retrieval of relevant patent documents by users.

Each record within the database defines a patent family, the grouping of patent documentation recorded at the various patent offices as protection of an invention is sought around the world. Each patent family is grouped around a Basic Patent, which is usually the first published example of the invention. All subsequent filings are referred back to the Basic Patent, and are referred to as Equivalent Patents. On this basis, the database has some 20 million "inventions", corresponding to tens of millions of patents, with almost a million new inventions added each year. From 2008, the number format of the Basic Patent Identifier (the Accession Number) changed, to allow up to 3.6 million records per year to be added, as the previous format only allowed a maximum of 1 million new records a year. This is due to the steady increase in unique patents filed each year.

== Basic format ==
- Primary level data - an electronic form of the original patent.
- Bibliographical data - cleaned and formatted patent numbers, inventor, application date etc. data.
- DWPI Abstract - a plain English summary of the novel feature, use and advantage of the invention
- DWPI manual code / Indexing - a custom taxonomy indicating the novel feature and use.

The database is produced by information provider Clarivate Analytics, previously part of Thomson Reuters.

== Special Indexing ==
=== Derwent Manual Codes ===
Derwent produces its own proprietary patent classification codes, called manual codes. The classification system contains subdivisions related to chemical, electrical and mechanical engineering subject matter.

=== Derwent Assignee Codes ===
Derwent indexers add standardized 4-letter codes to DWPI records to represent certain patent-holding companies. These codes are not available for all companies - only the top patent holding companies have these standard Derwent codes.

== History ==
Derwent World Patents Index can trace its origin to Delphion patent database, that originated in pre-World Wide Web era. Thomson Reuters acquired Delphion first, and them sold it to Clarivate in 2016.
