= European Classification =

The European Classification (ECLA) is a former patent classification system maintained by the European Patent Office (EPO). The ECLA classification system contains 134 000 subdivisions. It was introduced mainly as an extension of the International Patent Classification system in 1970, but sometimes it modifies its titles and rules. ECLA is used in connection with the indexing system ICO, which serves to identify additional information and aspects that are not covered by the ECLA schemes. ECLA has been replaced by the Cooperative Patent Classification (CPC) as of 1 January 2013.

== See also ==
- Cooperative Patent Classification (CPC)
- International Patent Classification (IPC)
