= Cooperative Patent Classification =

Patent classification system

The Cooperative Patent Classification (CPC) is a patent classification system, which has been jointly developed by the European Patent Office (EPO) and the United States Patent and Trademark Office (USPTO). The CPC is substantially based on the previous European classification system (ECLA), which itself was a more specific and detailed version of the International Patent Classification (IPC) system.

== Structure ==
Patent publications are each assigned at least one classification term indicating the subject to which the invention relates and may also be assigned further classification and indexing terms to give further details of the contents. The CPC system has over 250,000 categories.

Each classification term consists of a symbol such as "A01B33/00" (which represents "tilling implements with rotary driven tools"). The first letter is the "section symbol" consisting of a letter from "A" ("Human Necessities") to "H" ("Electricity") or "Y" for emerging cross-sectional technologies. This is followed by a two-digit number to give a "class symbol" ("A01" represents "Agriculture; forestry; animal husbandry; trapping; fishing"). The final letter makes up the "subclass" (A01B represents "Soil working in agriculture or forestry, parts, details, or accessories of agricultural machines or implements, in general"). The subclass is then followed by a 1- to 4-digit "group" number, an oblique stroke and a number of at least two digits representing a "main group" ("00") or "subgroup". A patent examiner assigns a classification to the patent application or other document at the most detailed level which is applicable to its contents.

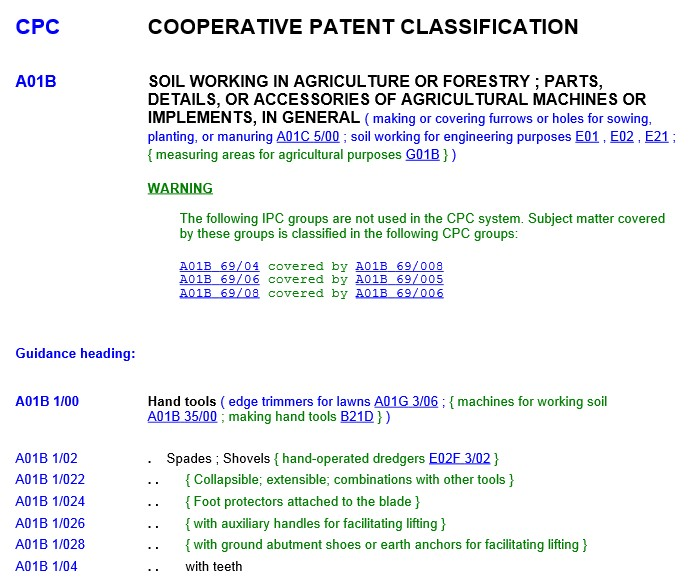
A01B CPC scheme

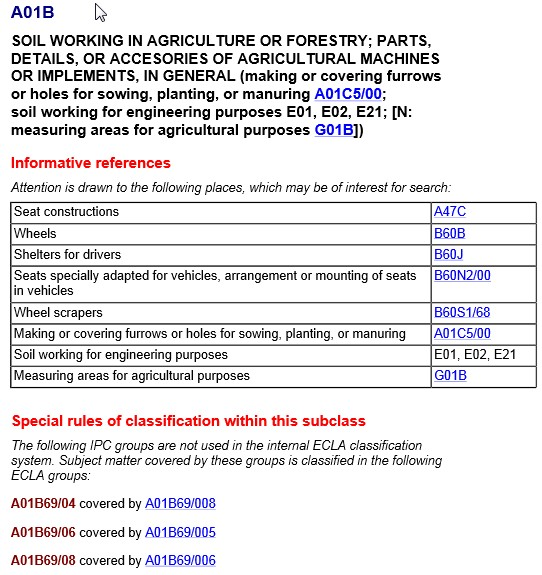
A01B CPC Definition

A: Human Necessities
B: Operations and Transport
C: Chemistry and Metallurgy
D: Textiles
E: Fixed Constructions
F: Mechanical Engineering
G: Physics
H: Electricity
Y: Emerging Cross-Sectional Technologies

This classification closely follows the International Patent Classification.

An example of the CPC classification scheme in the area of agriculture is shown in the figure.

The text in curly brackets {..} refers to text provided by the CPC classification scheme. The rest of the text refers to text originating from the International Patent Classification.

The CPC scheme is accompanied by a set of CPC Definitions, which are documents which explain how to use the CPC scheme for classifying and searching a specific technology. A part of the CPC Definition related to the scheme A01B is shown in the second figure.

=== Hierarchy ===
- Section (one letter A to H and also Y)
  - Class (two digits)
    - Subclass (one letter)
      - Group (one to four digits)
        - Main group and subgroups (at least two digits)

In the above example "A01B33/00"

- Section A
  - Class 01
    - Subclass B
      - Group 33
        - Main group 00

== History ==
Both the EPO and USPTO have been using the CPC since 1 January 2013. It replaced the ECLA system and will replace by 2015 the United States Patent Classification system (USPC) as the official patent classification scheme of both the EPO and the USPTO.

The patent offices of several EPO member states also use CPC, for example those of Austria, Finland, Greece, the United Kingdom, Spain (OEPM), and Sweden (PRV) and some other offices are negotiating a Memorandum of Understanding (MoU) like Chile (INAPI), Canada (CIPO), Australia and Israel.

On 4 June 2013, the Chinese State Intellectual Property Office (SIPO) agreed with the EPO that as of January 2014, SIPO would classify newly published patent applications in certain technical fields into the CPC. First SIPO staff will be trained by EPO. Starting in 2016, SIPO will strive to classify its new patent applications according to the CPC in all technical areas. The classification data is expected to be shared with the EPO.

On 5 June 2013, the USPTO and the Korean Intellectual Property Office (KIPO) announced the launch of a pilot project in which KIPO will classify some of its patent documents using the CPC system. The project has been said to mark a major step towards KIPO classifying all of its patent collection using the CPC.

On 26 September 2013, the EPO and the Russian Federal Service for Intellectual Property (Rospatent) agreed that as of January 2016, Rospatent will classify patent documents currently being processed into the CPC, and begin to classify previously published patent documents in 2017. The data will be shared with the EPO.

On 16 July 2015, the EPO and the Mexican Institute of Industrial Property (IMPI) agreed that as of January 2017, IMPI will classify patent documents currently being processed into the CPC, and begin to publish patent applications (A) and granted patent (B) and utility model documents in 2017. The data will be shared with the EPO.
