= International Patent Classification =

Hierarchical patent classification system

The International Patent Classification (IPC) is a hierarchical patent classification system used in over 100 countries to classify the content of patents in a uniform manner. It was created under the Strasbourg Agreement (1971), one of a number of treaties administered by the World Intellectual Property Organization (WIPO). The classification is updated on a regular basis by a Committee of Experts, consisting of representatives of the Contracting States of that Agreement with observers from other organisations, such as the European Patent Office.

== Classification ==
Patent publications from all of the Contracting States (and also most others) are each assigned at least one classification symbol indicating the subject to which the invention relates and may also be assigned further classification symbols and indexing codes to give further details of the contents.

Each classification symbol is of the form A01B 1/00 (which represents "hand tools"). The first letter represents the "section" consisting of a letter from A ("Human Necessities") to H ("Electricity"). Combined with a two digit number, it represents the "class" (class A01 represents "Agriculture; forestry; animal husbandry; trapping; fishing"). The final letter makes up the "subclass" (subclass A01B represents "Soil working in agriculture or forestry; parts, details, or accessories of agricultural machines or implements, in general"). The subclass is followed by a one-to-three-digit "group" number, an oblique stroke and a number of at least two digits representing a "main group" or "subgroup". A patent examiner assigns classification symbols to patent application or other document in accordance with classification rules, and generally at the most detailed level which is applicable to its content.

A: Human Necessities
B: Performing Operations, Transporting
C: Chemistry, Metallurgy
D: Textiles, Paper
E: Fixed Constructions
F: Mechanical Engineering, Lighting, Heating, Weapons
G: Physics
H: Electricity

== History ==
The origin of the International Patent Classification is the "International Classification" created under the European Convention on the International Classification of Patents for Invention. The first edition of the International Classification became effective on September 1, 1968. It consisted of eight sections, 103 classes, and 594 subclasses, as compared with the IPC eighth edition consisting of eight sections, 129 classes, 639 subclasses, 7,314 main groups, and 61,397 subgroups.

In 1967, BIRPI, WIPO's predecessor, and the Council of Europe began negotiations aiming to "internationalize" the International Classification. Their efforts bore the Strasbourg Agreement in 1971.

For the first seven editions of the IPC, the classification was updated approximately every five years. With the eighth edition, which came into force January 1, 2006, the system was revised and the classification was divided into "core" and "advanced" levels. The core level was to be updated on a three-yearly basis. The advanced level provided more detailed classification and was updated more frequently (probably every three months).

International Patent classification edition 8 was designed to allow patent offices the choice between a simpler to implement but more general classification using the core classifications, or a more detailed but more complex to maintain advanced classification.

This division into core and advanced levels was reversed with the 2011 version of IPC, IPC2011.01. The IPC is under continual revision, with new editions coming into force on January 1 of every year. The current version is IPC2021.01.

== See also ==
- Cooperative Patent Classification (CPC)
- Espacenet
- European Classification system (ECLA)
- F-term
- INPADOC
- Intellectual property analytics
