= Patent classification =

A patent classification is a system for examiners of patent offices or other people to categorize (code) documents, such as published patent applications, according to the technical features of their content. Patent classifications make it feasible to search quickly for documents about earlier disclosures similar to or related to the invention for which a patent is applied, and to track technological trends in patent applications.

Searches based on patent classifications can identify documents of different languages by using the codes (classes) of the system, rather than words. Patent classification systems were originally developed for sorting paper documents, but are nowadays used for searching patent databases.

== Main classification schemes ==
The International Patent Classification (IPC) is agreed upon internationally. The United States Patent Classification (USPC) is fixed by the United States Patent and Trademark Office (USPTO). An enterprise fixed the Derwent classification system. The German Patent Classification (DPK) was fixed by the German Patent Office (Deutsches Patentamt).

In October 2010, the European Patent Office (EPO) and USPTO launched a joint project to create the Cooperative Patent Classification (CPC) to harmonise the patent classifications systems between the two offices. From 2013, CPC replaced the European Classification (ECLA), which was based on the IPC but adapted by the EPO.

=== Class Schedule Classification ===
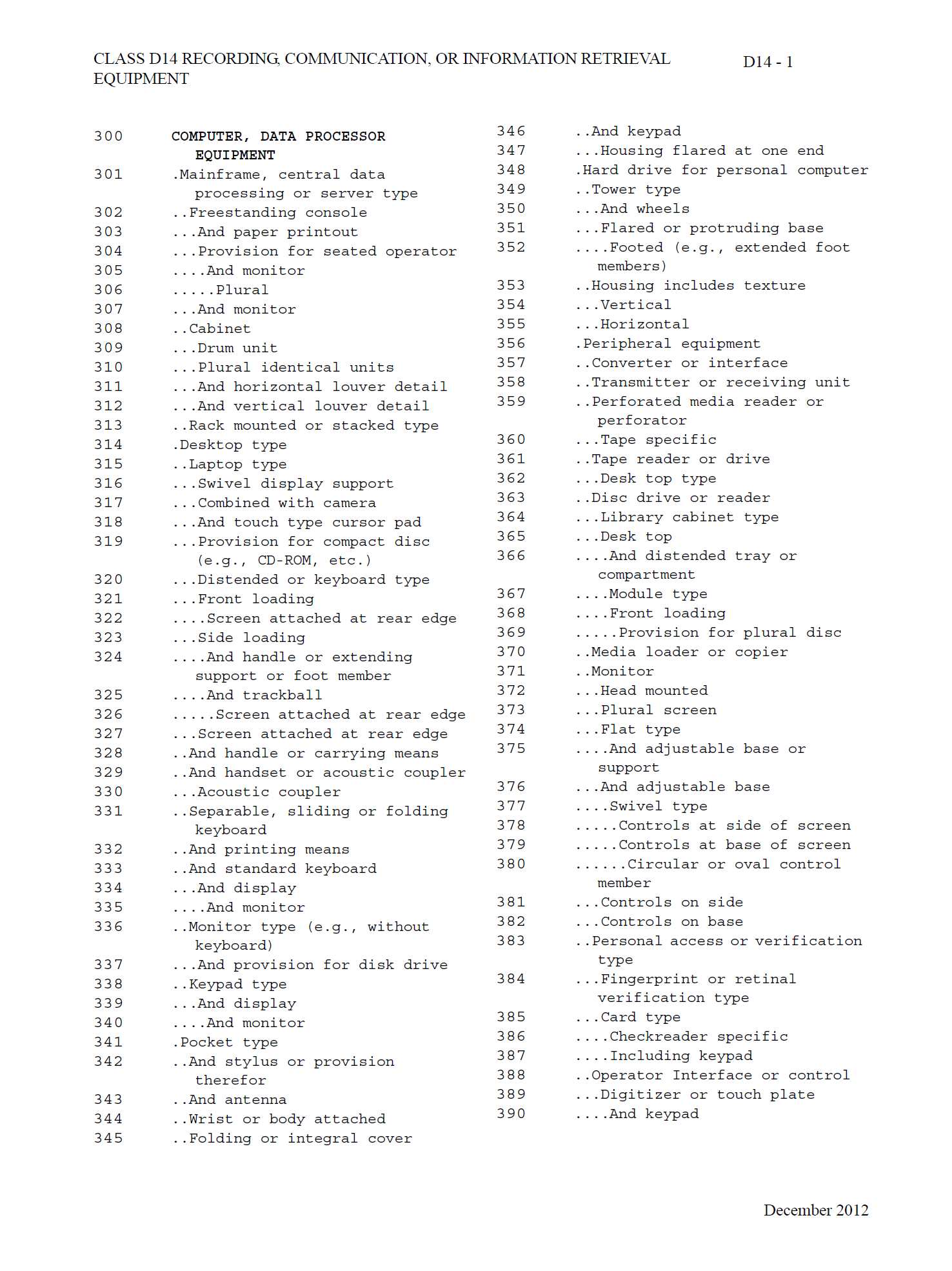
Index of U.S. Patent Classification.

The United States Patent and Trademark Office index patents by class and subclasses.

=== United States Classification (USPC) system ===
After implementing the Cooperative Patent Classification (CPC), only the plant and design classification material is updated within the USPC.

== See also ==
- European Convention on the International Classification of Patents for Invention
