= Toby Green (publisher) =

English publisher

- Education: University of Warwick, Marlborough College
- Employers: Applied Science Publishers Ltd (1984–1986); Coherent Digital, LLC (2019–); Academic Press Corporation (1982–1984); Elsevier (1991–1997); OECD (1998–2019); Pergamon Press (1987–1991)

Toby Green is a scholarly publisher who has worked with Academic Press, Applied Science Publishers, Pergamon Press, Elsevier Science, and the Organisation for Economic Co-operation and Development (OECD). At OECD, Green launched important digital publishing initiatives such as SourceOECD (2001), its successor the OECD iLibrary (2010), and the OECD Better Life Index (2011). In 2017, OECD Publishing won the Academic and Professional Publisher Award from The London Book Fair.

Green has chaired the Council of the Association of Learned and Professional Society Publishers (ALPSP, 2010) and served on the publishing board of the Royal Society of Chemistry and the board of Annual Reviews. In 2019, Green co-founded Coherent Digital to improve access to grey literature policy documents from IGOs, NGOs, research centers and think tanks.

== Early life and education ==
Green was born in Broadwindsor, Dorset, England and educated at Marlborough College. He attended the University of Warwick in Coventry, receiving a BSc in Microbiology and Virology in 1980.

== Career ==
External media

Audio
- Coherent Digital - on a mission to tame wild content: Toby Green, The INSPIRING STEM Podcast, May 12, 2022

Video
- 2021 NISO Virtual Conference: Grey Literature with Toby Green, Nov 20, 2021

Toby Green is a scholarly publisher who has worked with a wide range of organizations, publishing content for commercial organizations, scholarly societies, intergovernmental organizations (IGOs) and nongovernmental organizations (NGOs). Since 1982, Green has worked for Academic Press (1982-1984), Applied Science Publishers (1984 - 1986), Pergamon Press (1987–1991; taken over by Elsevier Science in 1991), Elsevier Science (1991-1997) and the Organisation for Economic Co-operation and Development (OECD, 1998-2019).

Green joined OECD Publishing in France in 1998 and has served as Chief operating officer (COO) of its Public Affairs and Communications Directorate and Head of Publishing. As of January 2001, Green launched SourceOECD, the first digital initiative to distribute books, journals and statistical databases through a commonly searchable subscription service that grouped publications into thematic clusters. In 2004, Green premiered OECD's StatLink service, connecting text publications and underlying data. In 2007, OECD made all of its books free to read in a basic form under a freemium business model, with additional premium services and print copies available for a fee. In 2010, Green launched the OECD iLibrary, a redesign of SourceOECD. In 2011, Green introduced the OECD Better Life Index, which received an Award for Innovation in Publishing from the Association of Learned and Professional Society Publishers (ALPSP).

He has served as a Member of the Council of the Association of Learned and Professional Society Publishers (ALPSP, 2002-2006) and became chair of ALPSP as of 1 January 2010. He was the first chair of ALPSP to be based outside of the UK. As of 2018 Green served on the publishing board of the Royal Society of Chemistry. He serves on the board of Annual Reviews.

As of 2020, Green was the Managing Director of Coherent Digital, which he co-founded in 2019 with Stephen Rhind-Tutt. Coherent Digital's initial Policy Commons collection provided access to almost 2.5 million policy documents published by IGOs, NGOs, researchers and think tanks, with the goals of making content more stable and findable. In June 2022, Content Digital reached an agreement with the Center for Research Libraries (CRL) under which many CRL affiliated institutions became founding institutional members of Policy Commons and received discounts or complimentary access In May 2023, Policy Commons was expanded to include World Cities, world-wide archives of municipal reports, in addition to its existing policy collections for North American City Reports and Global Think Tanks. In June 2023, Coherent Digital acquired Accessible Archives Inc., adding its digital collections in American social, economic, and political history to its History Commons. In 2023 Coherent Digital was named one of Outsell’s ‘Top 50 Emerging Companies’ in 2023.

Green has been a speaker at the Society for Scholarly Publishing (SSP), Association of Learned and Professional Society Publishers (ALPSP), Open Access Scholarly Publishing Association {OASPA), Fiesole Collection Development Retreat, Frankfurt Book Fair, London Book Fair, and the Researcher to Reader (R2R) conference. He discusses topics such as open source, grey literature and the impact of digitization on research and publishing. He helped to develop the guidelines for the production of scientific and technical reports of the Grey Literature International Steering Committee.

== Awards and honors ==
- 2005, StatLink was "Highly Commended" for Innovation in Publishing by the Association of Learned and Professional Society Publishers (ALPSP).
- 2011, OECD Better Life Index received an Award for Innovation in Publishing from the ALPSP.
- 2017, OECD Publishing won the Academic and Professional Publisher Award from The London Book Fair.
- 2021, Coherent Digital's Mindscape Commons, a collection of Virtual Reality (VR) videos for use in mental health education, was a co-recipient of the Award for Innovation in Publishing from ALPSP.
- 2023, Coherent Digital was named one of Outsell’s ‘Top 50 Emerging Companies’.

== Selected publications ==
- Green, Toby (19 December 2022). "Wait! What? There's stuff missing from the scholarly record?". Medical Writing. 31 (4): 44–48. doi:10.56012/ajel9043.
- Green, Toby (October 2019). "Maximizing dissemination and engaging readers: The other 50% of an author's day: A case study". Learned Publishing. 32 (4): 395–405. doi:10.1002/leap.1251.
- Green, Toby (January 2019). "Is open access affordable? Why current models do not work and why we need internet-era transformation of scholarly communications". Learned Publishing. 32 (1): 13–25. doi:10.1002/leap.1219.
- Green, Toby (October 2017). "We've failed: Pirate black open access is trumping green and gold and we must change our approach". Learned Publishing. 30 (4): 325–329. doi:10.1002/leap.1116.
- Green, Toby (15 August 2012). "Publishing Data Alongside Analysis, Books and Journals". Necessity is the Mother of Invention. pp. 523–548. doi:10.5703/1288284314789. ISBN 978-0-9834043-0-9.
- Green, Toby (1 July 2002). "Can the monograph help solve the library 'serials' funding crisis?". Serials: The Journal for the Serials Community. 15 (2): 135–139. doi:10.1629/15135.
