= European Association for Grey Literature Exploitation =

The European Association for Grey Literature Exploitation (EAGLE) was created in 1985 by European scientific and technical information centres and libraries in order to produce the bibliographic database System for Information on Grey Literature in Europe (SIGLE).

The objective was to improve information transfer, ensure availability of research results and increase international awareness of European grey literature by making the bibliographic records as widely available as possible.

The role of the members was to identify and collect documents, to prepare associated bibliographic and subject descriptions, to provide information services and products to users, and to archive and deliver copies of the grey literature documents.

== EAGLE history and economic model ==
From 1980 to 1985, SIGLE was funded by the Commission of the European Communities (CEC). When CEC financial support ended in 1985, the national centres formed a network for the acquisition, identification and dissemination of grey literature called EAGLE, who became the producer of the SIGLE database.

EAGLE was created as a non-profit making association registered in Luxembourg. In the beginning, membership was limited to the member countries of the European Union (former European Community) but this limitation was abolished in 1995. In the end, 15 countries participated actively, and discussions on partnership were going on with other potential members, especially in East European and North African countries.

The economic model of the association was based on initial funding by the European Commission and from 1985 onwards was based on membership fees and royalties from servers and products (CD-ROM, records). The SIGLE database was distributed by BLAISE, STN, EI and Ovid Technologies (Silverplatter) and in the early nineties by SUNIST in France. Records were also sold to vendor organizations like NERAC for specific use.

Costs were generated by the management of the association and mainly by the operating agent, whose task was to merge the national files into a unique server file every month.

== EAGLE members ==
- CEC (European Commission)
- Belgium (Leuven University Library)
- Czech Republic (National Library of Technology NTK)
- Denmark (Royal Danish Library)
- France (INIST-CNRS)
- Germany (TIB Hannover)
- Hungary (Central Library of the Budapest Technical University)
- Italy (Consiglio Nazionale delle Ricerche Biblioteca Centrale)
- Latvia (Latvian Academic Library)
- Luxemburg (Bibliothèque Nationale)
- Netherlands (National Library of the Netherlands)
- Portugal (Fundação para a Ciência e a Tecnologia)
- Russian Federation (VNTIC)
- Slovakia (Slovak Centre of Scientific and Technical Information)
- Spain (Centro de Informacion y Documentacion Cientifica)
- United Kingdom (The British Library)

== The EAGLE management ==
- General Assembly: Composed of the CEC and all participating countries.
- Executive Board: Composed of president, executive director, two vice-presidents and the TC chair.
- Technical Committee (TC): Composed of member delegates, TC chair, DPC.
- Executive Director
- Auditor
- Treasurer
- EAGLE Secretariat
- Data Processing Centre (DPC)

== EAGLE presidents ==
- David Wood (United Kingdom)
- Andrew Smith (United Kingdom)
- Joachim Schöpfel (France) 2005-2006
- Rob Wessels (Netherlands) - Executive Director

== Data processing centres ==
- Informalux (Luxembourg) -1992
- Italsiel/Finsiel (Italy) 1992-1996
- FIZ Karlsruhe (Germany) 1997-2005

== Decline and liquidation of EAGLE ==
The decline of the EAGLE concept twenty years after its creation had four reasons:

1. Internet: The 1985 concept of the SIGLE database has not been able to keep up with the rapid development with the Internet and the online resources. Even if FIZ Karlsruhe developed a web-version of SIGLE, the database production didn’t adjust to the possibilities offered by the new technologies of information:
  - No direct online cataloguing in a shared bibliographic database.
  - No metadata harvesting.
  - Very few records of e-documents.
  - Few direct access to full text.
  - Few links to other resources.
2. Organisational structure: The EAGLE structure (national input centres, a central operating agent) was unable to open the network easily to new and/or important producers of grey literature. Furthermore, it was not adapted to the need of flexible and rapid decision taking and marketing.
3. Coverage: For most of the EAGLE countries, the national input became less and less representative. Often, even for the national input centres input criteria and workload excluded a significant part of their grey collections (dissertations, reports, conference proceedings).
4. Economic model: The EAGLE model was based on flat membership fees and revenues from servers. Access to the database remained “traditional” with an annual subscription to the host or else a pay-per-view for each record with a credit card. This business model was not sustainable. With important members retiring from input and membership and the success of open access based initiatives, the economic model came to an end and needed revision. Investment for the development of the database was not provided.

EAGLE members were aware of these challenges and discussed possible options and solutions from 2002 on. Nevertheless, the organisational structure and the non-sustainable business model of the non-profit making and low budget association did not allow necessary strategy decisions. It also became obvious then that no institutional member would invest more than its membership fee and that another funding from the EU would be unlikely.

== Liquidation of EAGLE ==
In the face of this situation, the 2005 General Assembly from March 14, 2005, held at Karlsruhe, Germany, resolved unanimously to liquidate the association. The President (Joachim Schöpfel, INIST-CNRS) and the Vice-President (Silke Rehme, FIZ Karlsruhe) were appointed as liquidators.

After satisfaction of claims the remaining funds were distributed on equal parts amongst the members, taking into account the current memberships and the payment of the membership fees during the last years.

The contracts with STN, EI, NERAC and Ovid (SilverPlatter) were cancelled. The EAGLE website hosted by the Dutch Royal Library was deleted.

All usage rights of the SIGLE database lapsed upon complete liquidation of the association while the copyright on input remained with each member who supplied the records. Nevertheless, the General Assembly asked the operating agent, the FIZ Karlsruhe, for interim conservation of the SIGLE records in XML format beyond the liquidation of SIGLE, for the purpose of archiving and integration into a new open access European non-profit project (OpenSIGLE). Nearly all of the former EAGLE members signed a declaration of intention regarding this future use of their existing input of the SIGLE database.

The complete liquidation of EAGLE was published by the Luxemburg Register of Commerce and Societies at August 23, 2006.

== See also ==
- SIGLE
- OpenSIGLE
- Scientific literature
- Document delivery
- Grey Literature Network Service
- GLISC
