= Research report =

Report describing the results of a research project

A research report is a publication that reports on the findings of a research project.

Research reports are produced by many sectors including industry, education, government and non-government organizations and may be disseminated internally, or made public (i.e. published) however they are not usually available from booksellers or through standard commercial publishing channels. Research reports are also issued by governmental and international organizations, such as UNESCO.

There are various distribution models for research reports with the main ones being: public distribution for free or open access; limited distribution to clients and customers; or commercial sale. For example market research reports are often produced for sale by specialist market research companies, investment companies may provide research reports to clients while government agencies and civil society organizations such as UNESCO, the World Health Organization and many others often provide free access to organization research reports in the public interest or for a range of organization requirements and objectives.

== See also ==
- Annual reports
- Academic journals
- Grey literature
- Program evaluation reports
- Reports
- Research paper
- Securities research reports
- Technical report
