= System for Information on Grey Literature in Europe =

Database of bibliographic references

The "System for Information on Grey Literature in Europe" (SIGLE) was established in 1980, two years after a seminar on grey literature organised by the European Commission in York, England. Operated by a network of national information or document supply centres active in collecting and promoting grey literature, SIGLE was an online, pan-European electronic bibliographic database and document delivery system.

The objective was to provide access to European grey literature and to improve bibliographic coverage.

From 1980 to 1985, SIGLE was funded by the Commission of the European Communities (CEC). When CEC financial support ended in 1985, the national centres formed a network for the acquisition, identification and dissemination of grey literature called "European Association for Grey Literature Exploitation" or EAGLE, who became the producer of the SIGLE database.

Input to the database ended in 2005 when the EAGLE General Assembly decided the liquidation of the network.

In 2007, together with the last EAGLE operating agent, FIZ Karlsruhe, the French STI centre INIST-CNRS integrated the SIGLE records into a new open access database called OpenSIGLE hosted by INIST-CNRS.

== SIGLE characteristics ==
For each SIGLE member country, one or two national structures assumed the acquisition, referencing and document delivery of grey literature, mostly national libraries (UK, Luxembourg) or documentation centres of national research organizations (Italy, France, Germany). Merging of the national files was done by an independent operating agent under contract and the database was hosted on up to three different servers. A CD-ROM was produced from 1992 on by Silverplatter/Ovid Technologies.

Cataloguing rules and classification scheme were adopted from the International Nuclear Information System (INIS) database produced by the IAEA (International Atomic Energy Agency). The SIGLE classification was derived from the American COSATI scheme. One important difference to INIS was that SIGLE never included serials (only collections of monographs) and never provided records on an analytical level (book or report chapters, communications from conference proceedings etc.).

Each SIGLE record contained informative titles in English and/or in the original language, the author's name, academic degree, and the research organization or educational institution, the document's date of publication and type, number of pages, report numbers, and language, as well as subject classifications. Many records include keywords and abstracts.

Each national structure sent records in its own language. A search through the entire database was made possible through providing an English translation of the title or English keywords. One of these fields was mandatory. This constraint may seem irrelevant but for some countries it was a considerable barrier to increased input.

One of the goals of SIGLE from the beginning was to facilitate access to grey documents in Europe. Therefore:

- Each record contained a clear mention of availability (with or without shelf number).
- Each member country committed to supply the referenced document on demand, whether from its own collections or through interlending service by back-up libraries.
- Useful information on document supply (addresses, conditions) was given on specific help pages or in user-guides.

== Record samples ==
SAMPLE ONE

Accession Number

98:4462DE SIGLE

Title

Anaerobic co-treatment of biological waste materials and sewage sludge. Final report. Gemeinsame anaerobe Behandlung von Bioabfall und Klaerschlamm. Abschlussbericht.

Author

Risse, H.

Corporate Source

Technische Hochschule Aachen (DE). Lehrstuhl und Inst.fuer Siedlungswasserwirtschaft

Funding Organization

Oswald-Schulze-Stiftung, Gladbeck (DE)

Jan 1998. 83 p.

Availability

Available from TIB Hannover: F98B1076+a.

Document Type

Numerical Data

Country

Germany, Federal Republic of

Language

German

Abstract

The main goals of co-fermentation are sewage sludge stabilisation, production of a cyclable product and minimisation of process emissions. This research project focused on anaerobic wet fermentation. Criteria of evaluation were the quantity and quality of the resulting fermented sludge, biogas, and process water. In view of the scarcity of data on optimum process conditions, the investigations were to provide information, e.g.: Optimum ratio of biological waste to sewage sludge, influence of process conditions (temperature, charge volume, flow rate) on biogas production and process water burden. (orig.)

Classification Code

10U Biomass energy

Terms

BIOLOGICAL WASTES; SEWAGE SLUDGE; ANAEROBIC DIGESTION; METHANE; CHEMICAL OXYGEN DEMAND; AMMONIA; WASTE WATER; PHOSPHORUS; METALS; TEMPERATURE DEPENDENCE; EVALUATION; EXPERIMENTAL DATA.

SAMPLE TWO

Accession Number

98:20686GB SIGLE

Title

Switching to cheaper coals for power generation.

Author

Carpenter, A.M.

Corporate Source

IEA Coal Research, London (GB). Clean Coal Centre

Number of Report

IEACR-CCC—01

1998. 87 p.

Availability

Available from British Library Document Supply Centre-DSC:4362.64377(1).

ISBN 92-9029-301-2

Document Type

Report

Country

United Kingdom

Language

English

Classification Code

10A Coal

10T Other power plants

== SIGLE content ==
SIGLE was started in 1980, but since some members put in older documents, the earliest publications go back to the sixties. Pure and applied sciences were the first subjects to be covered, with economics, social sciences and humanities added in 1984. Although SIGLE was a multidisciplinary database, about one third of the records were found in the humanities and social sciences (>35%), followed by medical and life sciences (12%) and physics (9%). These figures were related to different practices of research communities to publish white only or grey, but also to the willingness of organizations to cooperate. Some of the documents existed only in three copies and it was not always easy for the SIGLE centre to obtain one of them.

Among the document types one finds a majority of reports, followed by doctoral theses or dissertations. In several countries monthly files were obtained by conversion from other catalogues, without a clear identification of the document type, so that the "miscellaneous" category is a "hold all" for these cases.

Over the years the content of the database improved. For instance, since 1997 English abstracts were added, in particular to Russian records. Members provided English keywords with increasing frequency. Even so, another important project was never realized: the integration of electronic documents, if possible with a link to the full text. Instead members started to build institutional repositories or to provide access to electronic grey literature by other means.

In October 1993 the SIGLE database contained 336,650 records, with around 40,000 new records being added each year. In September 1999, SIGLE contained more than 630,000 records with a current annual input of 60,000 records. The database was updated monthly.

The coverage in 1999	country was
49%	United Kingdom
24%	Germany
10%	France
17%	other countries

Records in 1999	document type
55%	reports
34%	theses and dissertations
11%	other documents

== The coverage by subject areas in 1999 ==
Subject area	coverage in %
Humanities and Social Sciences	35%
Biology and medicine	12%
Physics	9%
Engineering	7%
Electronics	7%
Earth Sciences	5%
Mathematics	4%
Chemistry	4%
Energy	4%
Environment	3%
Materials	3%
Agriculture	3%
Other (aeronautics, space technology…)	4%

In February 2005, SIGLE contained 855,260 records from 16 countries and the European Commission. UK, German, French and Dutch records represented 90% of the overall input. 63% of the records were reports, 32% were theses and dissertations, and the other records were conference proceedings, data files and translations.

The 2005 coverage broken down

Country	total number of records (with %)
Belgium	5,236 (0,6%)
Czech Republic	5,683 (0,7%)
France	72,752 (8,5%)
Germany	198,588 (23,2%)
Hungary	728 (0,08%)
Ireland	97 (0,01%)
Italy	30,758 (3,6%)
Latvia	3,916 (0,45%)
Luxemburg	33 (0,0%)
Netherlands	61,471 (7,2%)
Poland	87 (0,01%)
Portugal	1,780 (0,2%)
Russian Federation	19,524 (2,3%)
Slovakia	800 (0,09%)
Spain	11,256 (1,3%)
Sweden	14 (0,0%)
United Kingdom	434,007 (50,7%)
Commission of the EC	8,530 (1,0%)

== SIGLE Technical Committee members ==
- Czech Republic Jan Bayer, State Technical Library
- France Christiane Stock, INIST-CNRS
- Hungary Marta Leces, Kármán Tódor Számítástechnika Szakkollégium
- Latvia Dr. Aigars Krauze, Latvijas Akadēmiskā bibliotēka
- Portugal Gabriela Lopes da Silva, Fundacao para a Ciencia e a Tecnologia
- Slovakia Daniela Dranackova, Slovak Centre of Scientific and Technical Information of Slovak Republic
- Spain Marisol Hernando, Centro de Información y Documentación Científica

== See also ==
- Scientific literature
- Grey Literature Network Service
- GLISC Grey Literature International Steering Committee
- EAGLE European Association for Grey Literature Exploitation
- OpenSIGLE
