= National Reports Collection =

The National Reports Collection at the British Library is a collection of published annual reports, technical reports and other publications from private and public sector organisations. It forms part of the British Library's gray literature holdings. The collection adds approximately 17,000 works every year from more than 4,000 sources. Between 1980 and 1998, it collected 182,000 documents.

Increasing the availability of reports in the collection forms part of research being done by the MAGiC Project at Cranfield University.
