= On Line Opinion =

Australian right wing political online publication

- On Line Opinion website front page from 25 June 2020.
- Website type: Australian Political commentary
- Available in: English
- Country of origin: Australia
- Owner: Australian Institute for Progress Ltd
- Editor: Graham Young
- Website: onlineopinion.com.au
- Registration: No
- Launched: 7 April 2000; 26 years ago
- Current status: Active
- ISSN: 1442-8458

On Line Opinion, or Online Opinion, is an open access electronic journal, specialising in social and political debate. The journal is published in Australia, although content is not necessarily limited to Australian issues, and extends at times to publication in wider areas, such as, religion, ethics, and philosophy.

== Owner and publisher ==
On Line Opinion is owned and published by Brisbane based conservative political 'think tank' the Australian Institute for Progress Ltd (AIP). The AIP receives funding from property developers, and according to the Executive Director, it is 'ideologically centre-right', with its criticisms favouring right-wing political parties. Prior to 2014 the AIP was called The National Forum. In 2009, The Age reported that the board of The National Forum had editorial oversight over On Line Opinion, and had involved itself in rejecting an article that the editor had previously agreed to publish.

== Political links ==
The owner AIP has strong links to the Liberal National Party of Queensland. Editor Graham Young was once the vice-president of the Queensland Liberal Party. The Australian reported that Young "was shown the door [of the Queensland Liberals] in 2007 for "something like" bringing the party into disrepute on his well-regarded Online Opinion website."

== History ==
On Line Opinion was established in 1999 by political commentator Graham Young. In 2012, the report of the Independent Inquiry into Media and Media Regulation by former Federal Court judge Raymond Finkelstein stated that: "While the start-up costs for new print publications have been prohibitive and inhibited new enterprises emerging, the streamlining of the relationship between content producers and consumers has led to many new websites and web-based services. Among the most important such websites that have grown up in Australia over the last decade are Inside Story, Australian Policy Online, Online Opinion, The Drum, The Conversation, and New Matilda." The journal is referenced by the Australian National Library, with ISSN 1442-8458.

== Purpose ==
The contributors to On Line Opinion constitute a wide range of writers, including politicians, academics, and ordinary citizens with no particular public profile. Research suggested that On Line Opinion had a greater audience interactivity, but lower objectivity to comparable citizen journals because it publishes opinion only. It also suggested that, in comparative terms, publication within On Line Opinion is more timely than is the case with other citizen journals. Graham Readfern suggests On Line Opinion has given a platform to several climate science deniers.
