= Aquatic Commons =

Aquatic Commons was merged with OceanDocs to form AquaDocs in July 2021.

Aquatic Commons is a thematic digital repository covering the natural marine, estuarine, brackish and freshwater environments. Along with OceanDocs, which mainly covers high sea environments, Aquatic Commons is one of the two major repositories related to fisheries, aquatic life and water environments. Both of them include all aspects of management and conservation of their respective environments, their life and resources and also the economic, sociological and legal aspects related to those environments.

The repository was started in 2007 and currently offers more than 5200 full-text documents on an Open Access basis. Its total number of downloads at the end of September 2011 was more than 364.000. At present (March 2012), Aquatic Commons ranks 409 in the World Ranking of more than 1200 repositories , its strong points being the number of rich text files and the number of papers and citations in its domain, whereas its drawback seems to be, up to now, the visibility of its materials .

Aquatic Commons is run on a non-profit basis by the International Association of the Aquatic and Marine Science Libraries and Information Centers (IAMSLIC). As a co-funder, the Aquatic Sciences and Fisheries Abstracts (ASFA) Trust Fund basically provides support to those institutions in developing countries, for which the digitizing of the material could be beyond their possibilities. It generally does so within a project framework, which also includes the "repatriation" of the digitized materials, and the retention of their copyright by the respective original institutions in developing countries.

The benefits of an open access digital repository like Aquatic Commons for their participating institutions and end-users are well-known and include the following most important ones:

1. A secure site against the hazards of computer crashes, file corruption and virus attacks in relation to the conservation of digital copies of documents;
2. A robust technical platform able to guarantee long-term availability;
3. The commitment to preserve relevant documents and information on a specific topic for both published and grey literature of prestigious institutions, which otherwise could not be available online on an open access basis.

The list of the currently participating institutions and universities worldwide is here: .
