= Sheetster =

Extentech Inc.

- Developer: Extentech, Inc.
- Stable release: Sheetster Version 1.4 / October 27, 2009
- Preview release: 1.0 / January 27, 2009
- Written in: Java, JSP and JavaScript
- Operating system: Cross-platform
- Type: Spreadsheet
- License: Professional Edition is commercial / proprietary, Community Edition is Apache v2
- Website: www.sheetster.com

Sheetster is a GPL open-source Web Spreadsheet and a Java Application Server created by Extentech Inc. The product was created for the enterprise and small and medium-sized businesses as an Open Source alternative to closed document management systems.

== History ==
Built by Extentech Inc, a developer of Java spreadsheet and development tools, Sheetster BETA was made available to the public on June 8, 2007.

== Features ==
- Output to PDF
- Total Compatibility with Excel 1997–2007 Files (BIFF8 and XLSX Spreadsheets)
- Embed YouTube videos in your Spreadsheets
- Publish Spreadsheets as RSS with R3S
- Instant Web2.0 Apps with Forms, Charts, and Macros
- Role-based security and sharing

Sheetster runs on the ExtenXLS Java (programming language) Spreadsheet SDK and includes:

Sheetster Web Spreadsheet	ExtenXLS Java Spreadsheet SDK	Cellbinder Automation API	Spreadsheet Automation Server
Source Included/GPL	Customizable Java Swing GUI	REST API JSON/XML/HTML/CSV/XLS output	Object-Relational Mapper and Query Builder
Document chat	Named ranges	Secure content management system	Embeddable live data charts
Macros, forms, and gadgets for web 2.0 database applications	Excel 2007 compatibility	Data Mapping API	Collaboration, versioning, and access control

The Sheetster administration console allows for the design of relational data objects using a visual query designer and object-relational mapper. The RESTful API accepts data from a variety of sources, and outputs data-mapped spreadsheet objects in a variety of formats including JSON, XML, and as Excel-compatible XLS. Sheetster can be automated with macros and automatic data entry forms created from Excel cell ranges. Data Objects can be mapped to spreadsheet templates and output in a variety of formats:

- Excel 2007 Spreadsheet (.xlsx/.ooxml)
- Excel Binary Spreadsheet (.xls)CSV
- ExtenXLS XML Doc (.exml)
- Archive All Spreadsheets (.zip)
- XSLT Transform
- CSV

== Usage ==
A Sheetster Spreadsheet

Most common usages of sheetster:

- As a hosted web spreadsheet: www.sheetster.com
- As a web service embedded within other applications
- Spreadsheet calculations—used as secure formula engines within Web 2.0 and traditional client-server web applications.

== Storage ==
Sheetster can be stored in any database or file system of choice, such as:

- SaaS online access
- Local host server for offline access
- Behind the firewall
- On Amazon S3

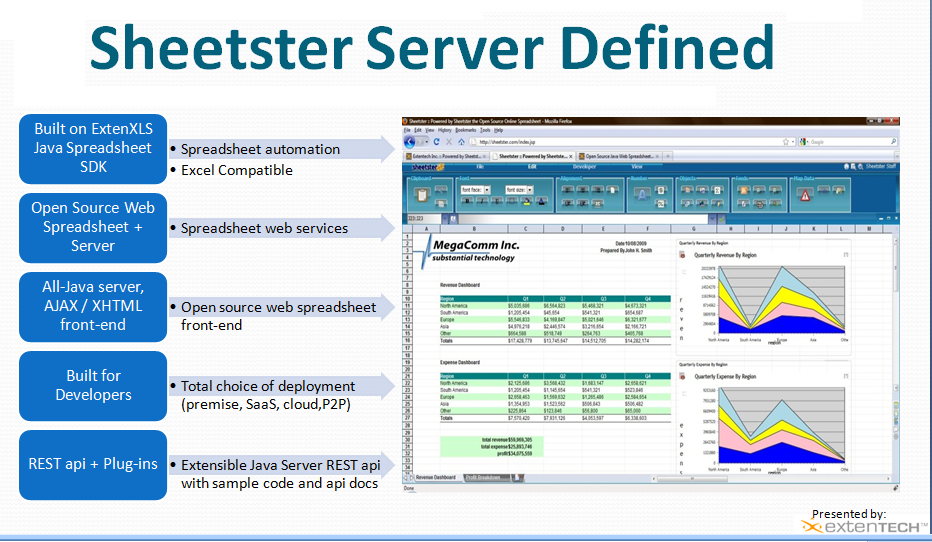
Sheetster Server Defined

== Integration ==
Integration is achieved through the RESTful API which allows for publishing of data-mapped spreadsheet cells as web services. Sheetster provides integrated support for:

1. Advanced server-based spreadsheet automation and functionality
2. Alfresco ECM
3. A REST API with JSON/XML/HTML/CSV/ and XLS output
4. Sheetster Web Spreadsheet (source included)
5. Built-in secure content management system
6. ExtenXLS Java Spreadsheet SDK
7. Customizable Java Swing administration GUI with Object-Relational Mapper and Query Builder

Integration guide

Sheetster is available for download at Extentech.com and Sourceforge.
