= OpenSIGLE =

Open access bibliographic database

The OpenSIGLE repository provides open access to the bibliographic records of the former SIGLE database. The creation of the OpenSIGLE archive was decided by some major European STI centres, members of the former European network EAGLE for the collection and dissemination of grey literature (European Association for Grey Literature Exploitation). OpenSIGLE was developed by the French INIST-CNRS, with assistance from the German FIZ Karlsruhe and the Dutch Grey Literature Network Service (GreyNet). OpenSIGLE is hosted on an INIST-CNRS server at Nancy. Part of the open Access movement, OpenSIGLE is referenced by the international Directory of Open Access Repositories.

== History of OpenSIGLE ==
SIGLE (System for Information on Grey Literature in Europe) was a unique multidisciplinary bibliographic database dedicated to grey literature. Up to 15 European partners participated in SIGLE, mostly national libraries or important research libraries. Created in 1980 and produced from 1984 onwards by EAGLE (European Association for Grey Literature Exploitation), the database was last available through STN International and on CD-ROM via Silverplatter/Ovid Technologies, until it stopped input in 2005. Together with other former EAGLE members, INIST decided to make the data publicly available on an open access platform. The OpenSIGLE website went live in December 2007.

OpenSIGLE is indexed by Google and Google Scholar, integrated in the portal of the WorldWideScience Alliance and included in the bookmarks of national libraries and research institutes.

== Implementation of OpenSIGLE ==
OpenSIGLE was developed on a MIT DSpace platform 1.3.2. In the following the database migrated to DSpace version 1.4. It is available under the Creative Commons Attribution Non-commercial No Derivatives (CC-BY-NC-ND) License.

== OpenSIGLE metadata ==
DSpace uses a qualified Dublin Core metadata set less detailed than the SIGLE metadata received from the former SIGLE operating agent DPC (FIZ Karlsruhe). The FIZ Karlsruhe XML records were written in the SIGLE format and completed by some server-related fields.

Several specific fields from the source format were merged to one field for OpenSIGLE. For example in the SIGLE record the English title could be either in the field for the original title or in the field for the English title. In the OpenSIGLE metadata, the English title appears systematically in the field labelled "Title".

Other fields were defined differently to fit with the metadata set. Some qualified fields were added to the metadata set used by DSpace without disturbing the OAI compliance: conference title, report number and availability statement.

The most significant change was a simplification in the document type information. The original SIGLE format distinguished between document type and literature indicator, but diverging conversion practices led to inconsistencies. OpenSIGLE proposes a simplified list of the principal document types.

== OpenSIGLE content ==
DSpace allows organizing the contents of a repository according to communities and collections. INIST decided to use 2 types of communities: the member countries and SIGLE subject categories on their primary level. Each country or subject category holds a collection of records. Some minor and less used subject categories were regrouped in one collection. In a mass upload on DSpace each record (or item) can be "attributed" to only one community or collection. We decided to choose the first classification code of each record. Since the files of each member country are treated separately, it is possible to declare also the country community for each record.

Contrary to the CD-ROM version, the document type is no longer searchable in OpenSIGLE. We found it interesting to display the information in the list of results, along with the title, the authors and the publication date. This is not a feature of the basic version of DSpace, but we observed similar practices in other repositories (see ERA 2006 and Glasgow 2006).

The SIGLE classification scheme with its 246 subject sub-categories can be searched through the subject field, either by its code or its wording. A specific help page accessible at any moment lists the complete classification schemes with both the codes and their description. As mentioned above, the subject areas were reduced to 15 entries for the organization of the database in collections and for browsing purposes.

For OpenSIGLE INIST chose the latest stable version available of the software which was then DSpace 1.3.2. One of the new features in this version is the support of multilingualism of the user interface (cf. DSpace system documentation 2006). This feature has been developed a bit further by a LIS student and OpenSIGLE can now be used with interfaces in English (the main version), French, German and Italian. These are the four most representative languages in the database. The help pages and the "About" information are available in English and French only, since they must be translated specifically.

Document delivery being very important for the SIGLE database, INIST decided to add an order form to facilitate contact with the holder of the document (former EAGLE member) and the information about the document’s availability in each record. In addition INIST gives updated information for each participating centre on each of the "Countries" pages.

== OpenSIGLE functionalities and perspectives ==
With the migration to the DSpace platform look and presentation of the former SIGLE records have changed.

Some data like the language or the document type are no longer searchable, but are still displayed, even in the list of results. The principal characteristics of the SIGLE database have been preserved or even improved. Access to the full text will be facilitated through an order form for document delivery and for some records hopefully through links to the electronic version in the future. Since the records are organized in collections based on the subject categories, and the OAI protocol for metadata harvesting considers collections as sets, a selective harvesting by subject will be possible.

More generally, OpenSIGLE seems to be the first migration of an important traditional bibliographic database into an OAI (Open Archives Initiative) compliant environment. Some factors facilitated this migration, e.g. the mapping of the metadata from a verpeny detailed format to a simpler one. The whole project benefited largely from INIST-CNRS previous experience with DSpace and in particular from knowledge about the import of records. Still OpenSIGLE provided INIST-CNRS with a new experience concerning mass uploads on an open-source platform.

Perspectives for the future developments of the OpenSIGLE archive are:

- Uploading the French data from 2005 onwards and thus closing the gap between the SIGLE and OpenSIGLE records.
- Integrating links to the full text whenever it exists. Even if the new repository contains only bibliographic records, links from the OpenSIGLE metadata to the electronic full text where available are technically possible but have to be provided by the former EAGLE members.
- Inclusion of the Dutch SIGLE records. Those of the former EAGLE members who didn’t sign the declaration of intention yet may reconsider their position and agree to the import of “their” national SIGLE input into the new database.
- Inclusion of current records from other countries.
- Integrating OpenSIGLE into other networks and portals. Linking the OpenSIGLE records to scientific or general search engines will largely enhance the visibility of the European grey documents of the last 20 years.

At the 12th International Conference on Grey Literature at Prague in December 2010, INIST-CNRS presented a new project called OpenGrey. OpenGrey signifies a new website with OAI-PMH, improved research facilities and export of records. OpenGrey also includes recent records and links to the full text. At the Prague conference, INIST and GreyNet called former SIGLE members and new partners to contribute to OpenGrey. In 2011 OpenSIGLE changed its platform and its name. OpenGrey provides new features and new content

== OpenSIGLE and GreyNet ==
For the past 15 years, GreyNet has sought to serve researchers and authors in the field of grey literature. To further this end, GreyNet has signed on to the OpenSIGLE repository and in so doing seeks to preserve and make openly available research results originating in the International Conference Series on Grey Literature. GreyNet together with INIST-CNRS have designed the format for a metadata record, which encompasses standardized PDF attachments of the full-text conference preprints, PowerPoint presentations, abstracts and biographical notes.

In 2010, OpenSIGLE provides open access to some 200 conference papers on grey literature, from 1995 to 2009. Twenty-one, full-text papers from the Second International Conference on Grey Literature held in Washington, D.C., on November 2–3, 1995, were added in March 2010. GreyNet purchased permission last year from Emerald to make openly accessible the papers published in the GL Conference Proceedings from 1994 to 2000. These earlier collections are added to the more recent collections in the OpenSIGLE Repository. The work involved relies on the efforts of INIST-CNRS as service provider and GreyNet as data provider. By autumn 2010, it is anticipated that all of the papers in the International Conference Series on Grey Literature will be fully accessible via the OpenSIGLE Repository.

OpenSIGLE participates in the WorldWideScience global science gateway.

== See also ==
- Scientific literature
- SIGLE
- Open Archives Initiative
- Grey literature
- DSpace
- Grey Literature Network Service
- Open access (publishing)
- WorldWideScience
- List of academic databases and search engines
