= Grey Literature International Steering Committee =

The Grey Literature International Steering Committee (GLISC) was established in 2006 after the 7th International Conference on Grey Literature (GL7) held in Nancy (France) on 5–6 December 2005.

During this conference, the Istituto Superiore di Sanità (ISS) (Rome, Italy) presented guidelines for the production of scientific and technical reports documents included in the wider category of grey literature (GL) defined at the International Conferences on Grey Literature held in Luxembourg (1997) and in New York (2004) – as "information produced on all levels of government, academics, business and industry in electronic and print formats not controlled by commercial publishing i.e. where publishing is not the primary activity of the producing body".

The Italian initiative for the adoption of uniform requirements for the production of reports was discussed during a Round Table on Quality Assessment by a small group of GL producers, librarians and information professionals who agreed to collaborate in the revision of the guidelines proposed by ISS.

The group approving these guidelines – informally known as the "Nancy Group" – has been formally defined as the Grey Literature International Steering Committee (GLISC).

The recommendations are adapted from the Uniform Requirements for Manuscripts Submitted to Biomedical Journals, produced by the International Committee of Medical Journal Editors (ICMJE) - better known as "Vancouver Style" (updated February 2006, available from ICMJE | Home and now adopted by more than 500 biomedical journals). These requirements also took into consideration the basic principles of ISO Standard Documentation entitled "Presentation of scientific and technical reports" (ISO 5966/1982) withdrawn in 2000. The ISO 5966 no longer met the requirements of ITC (Information Technology Communication), however, it still provides useful tips in the preparation of reports.

The Guidelines are created primarily to help authors and GL producers in their mutual task of creating and distributing accurate, clear, easily accessible reports in different fields. The goal of the Guidelines is, in fact, to permit an independent and correct production of institutional reports in accordance with basic editorial principles.

The Guidelines include ethical principles related to the process of evaluating, improving, and making reports available and the relationships between GL producers and authors. The latter sections address the more technical aspects of preparing and submitting reports. GLISC believes the entire document is relevant to the concerns of both authors and GL producers.

The Guidelines are informally known as "Nancy style".

== GLISC members ==
These are the institutions which officially adopted the "Nancy Style" in the production and distribution of grey literature.

- Istituto Superiore di Sanità (ISS) – Rome, Italy
- Institut de l'Information Scientifique et Technique (INIST-CNRS) – Nancy, France
- Grey Literature Network Service (GreyNet), Amsterdam – The Netherlands

Many other institutions all over the world do support and use the GLISC guidelines without a formal agreement which would require longer procedures.

== The GLISC Guidelines for the production of scientific and technical reports (also known as "Nancy style") ==
Authorship: The GLISC guidelines were prepared by Paola De Castro and Sandra Salinetti from the Istituto Superiore di Sanità, Rome (Italy). They were critically revised by Joachim Schöpfel and Christiane Stock (INIST-CNRS, Nancy, France), Dominic Farace (GreyNet, Amsterdam, the Netherlands), Catherine Candea and Toby Green (OECD, Paris, France) and Keith G. Jeffery (CCLRC, Chilton Didcot, UK). The work was accompanied by Marcus A. Banks (Memorial Sloan-Kettering Cancer Center, New York, USA), Stefania Biagioni (ISTI-CNR, Pisa, Italy), June Crowe (Information International Associates Inc., IIA, Oak Ridge, USA) and Markus Weber (Swiss Federal Office of Public Health, Berne, Switzerland).

Structure: The guidelines are divided in five sections:

1. Statement of purpose
2. Ethical considerations (authorship, peer review, confidentiality...)
3. Publishing and editorial issues (copyright, institutional repositories, advertising...)
4. Report preparation (instructions to authors, report structure, revision editing...)
5. General information on the Guidelines

The annex contains references and a list of institutions adopting the guidelines.

Update: The first version 1.0 from March 2006 was updated in July 2007 (version 1.1).

Translation: Version 1.1 was translated in French, German and Italian and Spanish.

Availability: Version 1.1 and translations are available on the GLISC website.

The total content of the Guidelines may be reproduced for educational, not-for-profit purposes without regard for copyright; the Committee encourages distribution of the material.

The GLISC policy is for interested organizations to link to the official English language document at www.glisc.info. The GLISC does not endorse posting of the document on websites other than GLISC . The GLISC welcomes organizations to reprint or translate this document into languages other than English for no-profit purposes.

== Comparison between "Nancy style" and ANSI/NISO Z39.18 ==
The ANSI/NISO Standard Z39.18-2005 Scientific and Technical Reports – Preparation, Presentation, and Preservation (released in 2005) has been considered a valuable source for comparison. The major differences concerning the two documents as a whole regard:

*Document type

They are different in that the "Nancy style" represents guidelines – that is general principles agreed upon by a small group of experts, to be followed as an indication or outline of policy or conduct –, while the ANSI/NISO Z39.18 is a proper standard, developed by the Standards Committees of the US National Information Standards Organization (NISO), subject to rigorous control and approval process including peer review. This is why also the structure of the two documents is different since the standard may repeat concepts in different sections which may be used separately, while the Guidelines are intended as an easy to read document giving the general idea for recommended items. The Guidelines, different from standards, do not give full details on format and style. Moreover, the "Nancy style" represents international guidelines developed by a corporate author (GLISC), which worked on the draft proposed by the Istituto Superiore di Sanità, and signed approval of this best practice on behalf of their respective organizations, while the ANSI/NISO Z39.18 is a national standard approved by the American National Standards Institute through a number of Voting Members.

*Paper vs digital document medium

The "Nancy style" is mostly paper oriented giving recommendations on report preparation mainly reflecting a traditional paper structure, while the organization pattern of the ANSI/NISO Z39.18 is user-based more than content-based. The key concepts incorporated in the American standard mainly refer to metadata, persistence of links, interoperability, creation, discovery/retrieval, presentation in digital format (DTD, XML, XSL), maintenance and preservation (original content, software and media); it also contains a metadata schema, which is absent in the Guidelines.

*Annexes

All material included in the "Nancy style" is approved by the GLISC, while the ANSI/NISO Z39.18 provides a large amount of additional information (almost half of the pages) that is not part of the Standard (Appendices including selected annotated bibliography, glossary, Dublin Core data elements, etc.).

*Content

In general, the "Nancy style" contains technical requirements for a report, but does not include full details (i.e. format, style, etc.); yet, it provides important elements, which are not present or not fully described in the ANSI/NISO Z39.18.

- Ethical issues

An initial section is explicitly devoted to authorship, editorship, peer review, conflicts of interest, privacy and confidentiality.

- Instructions for authors

Producers are strongly recommended to issue instructions to guide authors in the production of a formally correct document containing ethical and editorial issues as well as indications for formats, styles, illustrations, etc.

- Revision

Special attention is given to revision editing as GL is not generally peer reviewed, or produced with editorial support; therefore, it is fundamental that authors be aware of the importance of a careful revision of their texts before diffusion.

- Reference style

The adoption of the "Vancouver style" is recommended and examples and rules are given as a fundamental step for information retrieval. As regards document structure, it is basically the same in "Nancy style" and ANSI/NISO Z39.18, with minor terminological variations. Yet, the American standard explicitly gives indication on: – Report Documentation Page (since it is used by some agencies within the federal government, and also some sample pages are given). – Distribution list. – Glossary (although not part of the Standard). – Executive abstract.

*Technical recommendations

Since the "Nancy style" represents guidelines and not a standard, all technical considerations are limited to the essential, while the ANSI/NISO Z39.18 gives indications (all absent in the "Nancy style") on:

- Print-specific/non-print-specific recommendations

The Section 6 "Presentation and display" describes standard methods for ensuring consistency in presentation including designing visual and tabular matter, formatting, etc. and makes a distinction between rules applicable to all reports regardless of mode of publication (paper or digital) and rules applicable to reports published in paper form only.

- Format

Specific information is provided on fonts, line length, margins, page numbering, style, units and numbers, formulas and equations, paper (format and type), printing equipment, ink. The ANSI/NISO Z39.18 also includes specifications on index entries and errata, which are not present in the "Nancy style".

== Support, translation and updating of the "Nancy style" ==
Many institutions considered the relevance of the GLISC Guidelines for the production and distribution of technical reports and for educational purposed, therefore, accepted to carry out the translation of the original English version into different languages.

Translations are available in:

- Italian - translation carried out by the Istituto Superiore di Sanità
  . The ISS published a technical report on "Grey literature in scientific communication: "Nancy style" to guarantee editorial quality of technical reports", including the translation of the GLISC guidelines Rapporti ISTISAN 06/55
- French - translation carried out by INIST - Institute for Scientific and Technical Information - France INIST - Institute for Scientific and Technical Information - France - Nancy Style
- German translation carried out by Technischen Informationsbibliothek (TIB), Hannover - Germany
- Spanish - translation carried out by Universidad de Salamanca - Spain

The GLISC guidelines and the impact of grey literature on science communication were also appreciated by the European Association of Science Editors which included a chapter on grey literature in their Science Editor's Handbook. The use of GLISC guidelines is also supported by the European NECOBELAC Project Necobelac financed by the European Commission within the [7 Framework program], by the US National Library of Medicine Research Reporting Guidelines and Initiatives: By Organization, by the German National Library of Science and Technology TIB - Technische Informationsbibliothek: Reports / Germany and by the French Academic Agency of Francophony .

Next steps for updating the GLISC Guidelines could be:

- Adding an Appendix on metadata
- Creating a Subject index
- Providing more technical advice on digital format
- Facilitating reference

The Guidelines should be considered as a suggested model rather than a model in itself; they represent a basic step to improve quality in the different stages of GL production in view of its wider electronic circulation. The proposals for their updating will make them more effective, although a regular revision is required to keep pace with the changing ITC scenarios and information policies (see De Castro et al. 2006).

== On the development of the GLISC guidelines ==
*Electronic grey literature The "Nancy style" is mostly paper oriented, because editorial consistency and ethical considerations recommended for traditional documents do apply also to digital publications. Yet, progressively more and more GL is being produced, stored, published and made available electronically and in order to manage relevant GL publications, metadata are required. The importance of metadata, as the natural evolution of library catalogue records, had been already stressed in the first version of the "Nancy style" (when dealing with report structure: Section 4.2 of the Guidelines), but no metadata schema was then provided since it was difficult to find a formula that would satisfy all requirements. At present, much GL is catalogued using the Dublin Core Metadata Standard (DC). However – as Keith Jeffery of the UK Council for the Central Laboratory of the Research Councils (CCLRC) pointed out working on the "Nancy style" draft – this standard has several problems: a) it is machine-readable but not machine-understandable; b) it does not have a formalised syntax or semantics and therefore is open to ambiguous interpretations. Therefore, he proposed a formalised metadata standard (an umbrella standard, mainly generated from Dublin Core metadata: "Formalised DC" based on the concepts of the CERIF Model (Error message (euroCRIS)). Yet, as the traditional cataloguing practice has different rules, similarly different communities may adopt different metadata schema. Nowadays the World Wide Web provides the possibility to search for information across heterogeneous archives/databases/catalogues, but the systems managing different information resources must be "interoperable" (capable to work together), and interoperability requires that the same metadata schema be used. As Stefania Biagioni (of the Italian Istituto di Scienza e Tecnologie dell'Informazione - ISTI, Consiglio Nazionale delle Ricerche) clearly commented, there is much work towards standardization and the Dublin Core Initiative (DCMI: Home) is receiving worldwide consensus as it suggests adding a very simple metadata record to any specialized one.

*Adoption strategy When consensus was to be reached to release the first version of the Guidelines, a formal approval was asked to all organizations wishing to officially adopt them. Contrary to expectations, consensus was given only by a small number of institutions as the official adoption was sometimes a difficult step. Yet, support and encouragement did not lack: a less formal approach in launching the Guidelines and getting them adopted was soon granted by all institutions involved in their creation. For example, a large international organization (Organisation for Economic Co-operation and Development - OECD), which took part in the development of the Guidelines, expressed concern to officially endorse them (and in fact, it did not), because that would require a great deal of internal debate and discussion with their own members. Suggestions were made to follow a voluntary system backed up by an official recognition of compliance to facilitate the adoption of the Guidelines. This would encourage like-minded supporters within an organisation to informally use the Guidelines and then gain the official "stamp of approval" to show that they are really following them. Actually, other organizations policies take a voluntary approach in the documents they recommend, such as the Association of Learned and Professional Society Publishers (ALPSP) with more than 230 not-for-profit publishers. As suggested by the OECD, voluntary sign-up is a less demanding step for organisations to take, but the effect is the same – more and more publishers will opt to use them.

== See also ==
- Scientific literature
- Technical report
- Grey literature
- European Association of Science Editors
- OpenSIGLE
- Scientific writing
- Academic authorship
