= ExtenXLS =

ExtenXLS is a Java Excel Reporting Toolkit developed by Extentech. It is a Reporting API that allows for the reading in, modifying and creation of spreadsheet-based reports from Java applications.

Written entirely in the Java programming language, ExtenXLS creates new spreadsheet files from scratch as well as from existing spreadsheet files templates. ExtenXLS has the ability to utilize data from any source and output it in Excel-compatible XLS, XML, and HTML formats.

Common uses range from a Java Servlet that produces financial analysis reports to JavaBeans embedded in JavaServer Pages for use in executing formula calculations. The ExtenXLS API can be used as a desktop spreadsheet component or embedded in a server application. With the ability to reuse existing spreadsheets, ExtenXLS can update template XLS files with fresh data from databases and output to custom reports. It has an Excel compatibility, template input files can range from a variety of complex legacy spreadsheets such as: surveys, checklists, what-if scenarios, and historical portfolio data.

ExtenXLS contains methods that can create new WorkBooks from scratch, allowing for the insertion of new cells containing text, and numeric data. The product allows for customization of output with hundreds of fonts, colors, patterns, borders, formulas, named ranges, and built-in formats such as: currency, date, financial and numeric formatting patterns.

Other potential uses include: user interfaces built with the included Java Swing spreadsheet components, and transformations of spreadsheets into HTML, and XML.
