= DOGE (database) =

Academic bibliographic database

- Producer: INIST (France)
- Languages: English, French

Access
- Providers: OCLC, ProQuest, Ovid Technologies
- Cost: Subscription

Coverage
- Disciplines: Business management
- Record depth: Index & abstract
- Format coverage: reports, research papers, dissertations
- Temporal coverage: 1984-present
- Geospatial coverage: Worldwide, with emphasis on France and Europe
- No. of records: > 26.000
- Update frequency: Quarterly

Links
- Website: doge.inist.fr/presentation.php

DOGE (French: Documentation en Gestion des Entreprises) is an academic bibliographic database, which is maintained by INIST (Institute of Scientific and Technical Information), French National Centre for Scientific Research (CNRS), in collaboration with the "Réseau d’Information en Gestion des Entreprises" (Information Network for Business Management) – under the coordination of the Institut Européen de Données Financières, EUROFIDAI (European Financial data Institute), and the CNRS Department of Humanities and Social Sciences (SHS). DOGE covers research documents in all aspects of business management with special emphasis on European literature.

== See also ==
- DOGE's page on the INIST official website
- INIST (official website)
- EUROFIDAI Homepage
