= Technical report =

Document describing technical research

A technical report (also scientific report) is a document that describes the process, progress, or results of technical or scientific research or the state of a technical or scientific research problem. It might also include recommendations and conclusions of the research. Unlike other scientific literature, such as scientific journals and the proceedings of some academic conferences, technical reports rarely undergo comprehensive independent peer review before publication. They may be considered as grey literature. Where there is a review process, it is often limited to within the originating organization. Similarly, there are no formal publishing procedures for such reports, except where established locally.

== Description ==
Technical reports are today a major source of scientific and technical information. They are prepared for internal or wider distribution by many organizations, most of which lack the extensive editing and printing facilities of commercial publishers.

Technical reports are often prepared for sponsors of research projects. Another case where a technical report may be produced is when more information is produced for an academic paper than is acceptable or feasible to publish in a peer-reviewed publication; examples of this include in-depth experimental details, additional results, or the architecture of a computer model. Researchers may also publish work in early form as a technical report to establish novelty, without having to wait for the often long production schedules of academic journals. Technical reports are considered "non-archival" publications, and so are free to be published elsewhere in peer-reviewed venues with or without modification.

== Production guidelines ==
- ANSI/NISO has published guidelines on the Scientific and Technical Reports – Preparation, Presentation, and Preservation last updated in 2010. This standard outlines the elements, organization and design of scientific and technical reports, including guidance for uniform presentation of front and back matter, text, and visual and tabular matter in print and digital formats, as well as recommendations for multimedia reports.
- The International Organization for Standardization also had published in 1982 International Standard ISO 5966:1982 Documentation – Presentation of scientific and technical reports., but then withdrew this standard in 2000.
- The Grey Literature International Steering Committee (GLISC) established in 2006 published guidelines for the production of scientific and technical reports. These recommendations are adapted from the Uniform Requirements for Manuscripts Submitted to Biomedical Journals, produced by the International Committee of Medical Journal Editors (ICMJE) – better known as “Vancouver Style”.

== Publication and identification ==
Many organizations collect their technical reports into a formal series. Reports are then assigned an identifier (report number, volume number) and often share a common cover-page layout. Technical reports used to be made available in print, but are now more commonly published electronically (typically in PDF), whether on the Internet or on the originating organization's intranet.

Several schemes have been proposed or are in use to uniquely identify either an entire report series or an individual report:

- The entire series may be uniquely identified by an ISSN. Where reports are published both on paper and electronically, two different ISSNs are often assigned to distinguish between these.
- A Standard Technical Report Number (STRN) identifier scheme, proposed for use by U.S. government agencies, was first defined in 1974, and became U.S. national standard ANSI/NISO Z39.23 in 1983. Such numbers consisted initially of two parts: (1) a report code of alphanumeric characters that designate the issuing organization and series, and (2) a sequential group of numeric characters assigned by the issuing organization. The national maintenance agency for assigning report codes was the National Technical Information Service (NTIS), which also operates the National Technical Reports Library. The Z39.23 standard was further revised in 1990 to allow longer codes and greater variability of separators. This extended format was in 1994 also adopted in ISO 10444 (see below), and remains (after an "ISRN" prefix) in the current version ANSI/NISO Z39.23-1997.
- An international registration scheme for a globally unique International Standard Technical Report Number (ISRN) was standardized in 1994 (ISO 10444). It had aimed to be an international extension of the ANSI/NISO Z39.23 scheme. However the registration agency needed for its operation was never implemented in practice. ISO finally withdrew this standard in December 2007.
- Like many other scientific publications, technical reports are now also commonly uniquely identified via the Digital Object Identifier (DOI) system, which facilitates access via HTTP. DOIs have now in practice largely replaced Z39.23-style standard technical report numbers.
