= SourceOECD =

Former online library of the OECD

SourceOECD was the online library of the OECD from 2001 to 2010. In July 2010 it was replaced by OECD iLibrary.

== OECD publications ==
The OECD publishes roughly 250 books a year, on subjects as diverse as general economy, statistics, agriculture, science, future studies or environment. Of all international organisations in the economics field, it's arguably the one with the widest scope.

SourceOECD also hosts 18 series of working papers.

The OECD also maintains 82 statistical databases. On SourceOECD, they are accessible in their interactive form: the user can perform queries online.

== Access ==
SourceOECD's clients are librarians in a broad sense: universities, administrations, institutions, corporations. They buy access for their users, who can subsequently access SourceOECD without being charged or asked for identification. The potential audience of SourceOECD is about 15 million users.

== DOIs ==
The OECD uses extensively digital object identifiers for their publications. Each working paper is assigned a DOI, and many publications also use DOIs for their tables and graphs (statlinks). Using these DOIs, the reader can retrieve documents in a ready-to-use, electronic form.

== Web books ==
SourceOECD features a series of reference books with no access restriction: the web books. Its other online books are available in pdf format. The web books are a series of structured HTML web pages, from which the user can easily access the cited publications as well as tables and graphs. OECD's most-used web book is the OECD Factbook.

== Easylinks ==
Virtually every OECD publication has an easylink, a URI that links directly to its online form. Typically, the easylink is "www.sourceOECD.org/" followed by the ISBN of the publication.
