= OECD iLibrary =

Former virtual library

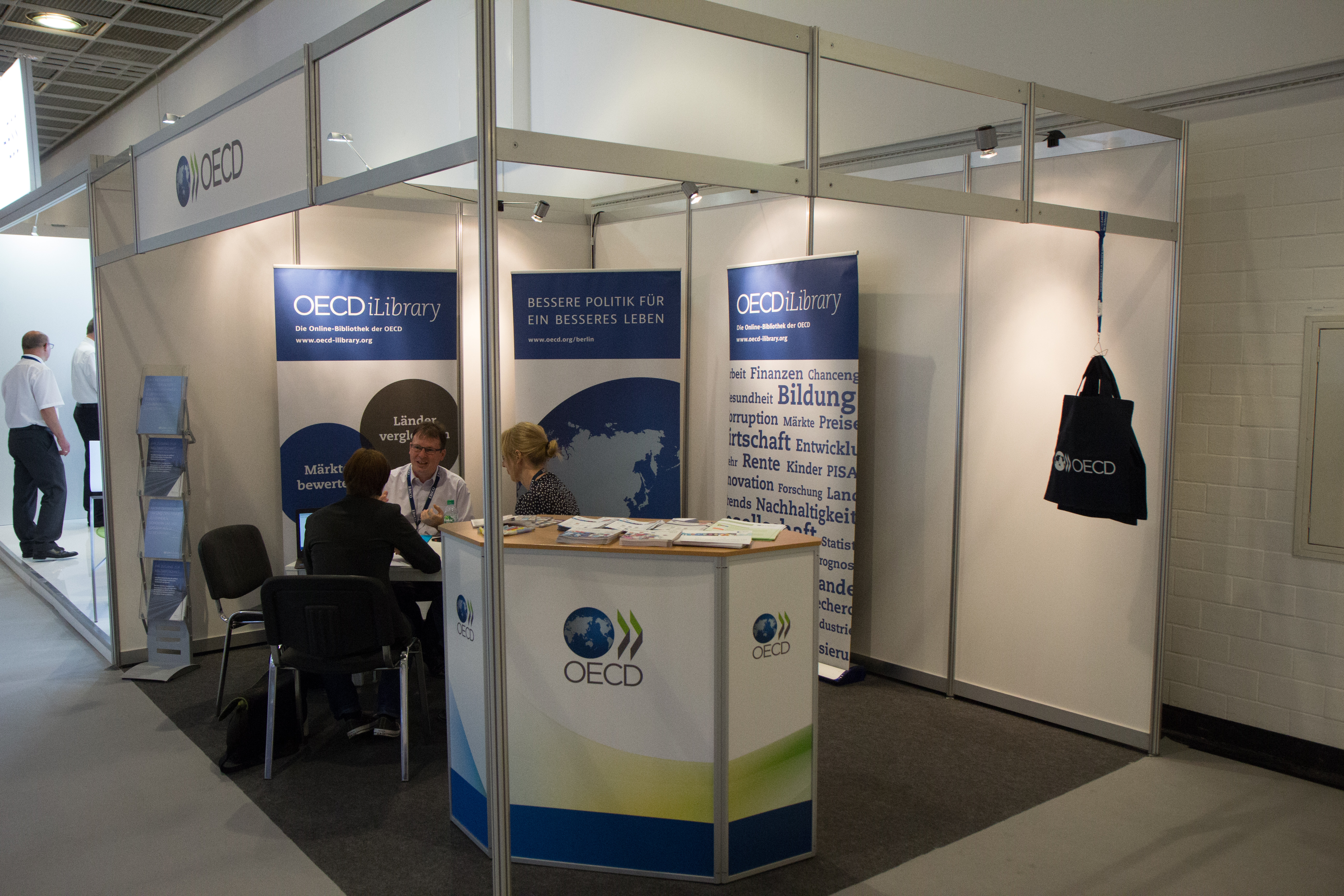
Information stand for the OECD iLibrary at the German Libraries Day, May 2017

OECD iLibrary was an OECD online library for books, papers and statistics and the gateway to OECD's analysis and data. It operated from July 2010 to July 2024, replacing a previous online library, SourceOECD. In July 2024 the OECD adopted an open-access information model for all its data and publications and replaced the iLibrary with a publications website.

== Content ==
OECD iLibrary contained content released by Organisation for Economic Co-operation and Development (OECD), International Energy Agency (IEA), Nuclear Energy Agency (NEA), OECD Development Centre, Programme for International Student Assessment (PISA), and International Transport Forum (ITF).

During the period the iLibrary operated, the OECD released between 300 and 500 books each year. Most books were published in English and French. The OECD also published reports, statistics, working papers and reference materials. All titles and databases published since 1998 were accessed via OECD iLibrary. All content was hosted by the OECD for users to find - and cite - tables and databases in the same way as articles or chapters, in any available content format: PDF, WEB, XLS, DATA, ePUB.

OECD iLibrary Statistics was listed in the Registry of Research Data Repositories re3data.org.

OECD Publishing developed the WTO iLibrary for the World Trade Organization based on the OECD iLibrary.

== Access ==
OECD iLibrary provided access to all OECD's publications, working papers and datasets, published since 1998 (and some older titles too) to anyone with an internet connection. It also offered premium services to subscribers. Any individual or organisation could purchase a subscription, but subscribers were usually universities and research organisations, businesses, governments and public administration, non-governmental organisation and think tanks.
