= National Technical Information Service =

United States government agency

National Technical Information Service (NTIS)
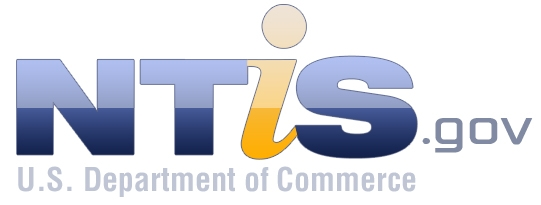

Agency overview
- Formed: 1945; 81 years ago (as Publication Board), became Commerce's Clearinghouse for Federal Scientific and Technical Information (CFSTI) 1964, National Technical Information Service (NTIS) 1970
- Headquarters: Alexandria, Virginia, United States; 38°49′14″N 77°03′02″W
- Employees: 100
- Annual budget: Fee-based, no federal appropriations
- Agency executive: Jeremiah Jones, Director
- Parent agency: Department of Commerce
- Website: www.ntis.gov

The National Technical Information Service (NTIS) is an agency within the U.S. Department of Commerce. The primary mission of NTIS is to collect and organize scientific, technical, engineering, and business information generated by U.S. government-sponsored research and development, for private industry, government, academia, and the public. The systems, equipment, financial structure, and specialized staff skills that NTIS maintains to undertake its primary mission allow it to provide assistance to other agencies requiring such specialized resources.

== Overview ==
Under the provisions of the National Technical Information Act of 1988 (15 U.S.C. 3704b), NTIS is authorized to establish and maintain a permanent repository of non-classified scientific, technical and engineering information; cooperate and coordinate its operations with other Government scientific, technical, and engineering information programs; and implement new methods or media for the dissemination of scientific, technical, and engineering information, including producing and disseminating information products in electronic format and to enter into arrangements necessary for the conduct of its business.

NTIS serves the United States as a central repository for government-funded scientific, technical, engineering, and business related information to assure businesses, libraries, academia, and the public timely access to approximately 2.5 million publications covering over 350 subject areas. The stated aim of NTIS is to support the Department of Commerce mission to promote the nation's economic growth by providing access to information that stimulates innovation and discovery (Public Law 102-245, Section 108 American Technology Preeminence Act of 1991).

Additionally, NTIS acts as the federal government's IT provider and consultant.

== Operations ==
NTIS operations includes the acquisition and archiving in perpetuity of scientific and technical information. This information is freely available at no charge, by law. The cost of operating the site, however, must also by law be recovered from those using the site for anything beyond raw data access. There is a fee for use of the search tools.

NTIS also provides technical support services to other federal government agencies. These lines of business include:

- Shipping & Fulfillment Services
- e-Training Services; NTIS is an OPM-approved e-Training Service Provider
- Federal Energy Data Management, mandated by the Energy Policy Act of 2005
- Government Web Hosting
- Scanning, Digitization & Electronic Archive Services; NTIS currently working with the Social Security Administration, National Science Foundation, Internal Revenue Service, and other Federal Agencies
- Other support services include Electronic & Multimedia Services, Email Broadcast & Fax Management, and Billing & Collections Services

== Initiatives ==

In 2008, NTIS recognized the need to provide subscription-based access to the collection using an online platform. Incrementally in 2009, and 2012, National Technical Reports Library (NTRL). Federal Science Repository Service (FTRS) followed V3 of NTRL.

NTIS has been working with Public.Resource.Org to digitize videos and to post content on YouTube.

== Statutory authorities ==
NTIS' basic authority to operate a permanent clearinghouse of scientific and technical information is codified as chapter 23 of Title 15 of the United States Code (15 U.S.C. 1151–1157). This chapter also established NTIS' authority to charge fees for its products and services and to recover all costs through such fees "to the extent feasible."

== See also ==
- Defense Technical Information Center
- Government Printing Office
- National Archives and Records Administration
- National Technical Reports Library
