= Australian Policy Online =

Australian non-profit organisation

Australian Policy Online (APO) is a not-for-profit open access repository or digital library, specialising in public policy grey literature, mainly from Australia and New Zealand, with some coverage of other countries. The organisation was founded as Australian Policy Online before changing its name to the Analysis & Policy Observatory in 2017 and reverting back to the original name in 2025.

== History ==
Australian Policy Online (APO) was established in 2002 at Swinburne University of Technology in Melbourne. It was intended as a way to collate and disseminate academic research reports and other grey literature that was increasingly proliferating online. It has since established itself as a notable resource for people involved in policy research in Australia and New Zealand.

The organisation underwent a name change to Analysis & Policy Observatory in 2017. The organisation reverted to its original name, Australian Policy Online, in September 2025.

== Governance and funding ==
APO is a not-for-profit organisation supported by partnerships with academic institutions and government agencies, and advertising and services revenue. APO has also been awarded a number of Australian Research Council grants.

In late 2023 APO was closed at Swinburne University and reopened at McKinnon (formerly the Susan McKinnon Foundation) in January 2024.

== Purpose ==
APO was established to address the transformation of production for publications brought about by the internet. Frustrations with the limitations of the academic publishing system – long delays, lack of access or a limited audience – were causing producers of academic and other content to move online and increasingly produce grey literature (informally published material, such as reports, that may be difficult to trace via conventional channels). The informal channels used to disseminate digital grey literature have meant that libraries and other services have only been able to collect it in an ad hoc manner. APO aims to make digital research content that is relevant to Australian policy debates more easily accessible and usable to promote more evidence-informed decision-making.

In partnership with McKinnon, APO's objective is to support evidence-based policymaking in Australia.

== Activities and description ==
APO specialises in cataloguing grey literature on public policy from academic research centres and think tanks, as well as government and non-government organisations. As well as research, the site includes a smaller collection of opinion and commentary pieces, video, audio, and web resources focused on policy issues.

APO's open access digital repository is searchable, and APO provides a free email newsletter service that notifies subscribers of the latest additions to the repository.
