= Report =

Informational, formal, and detailed text

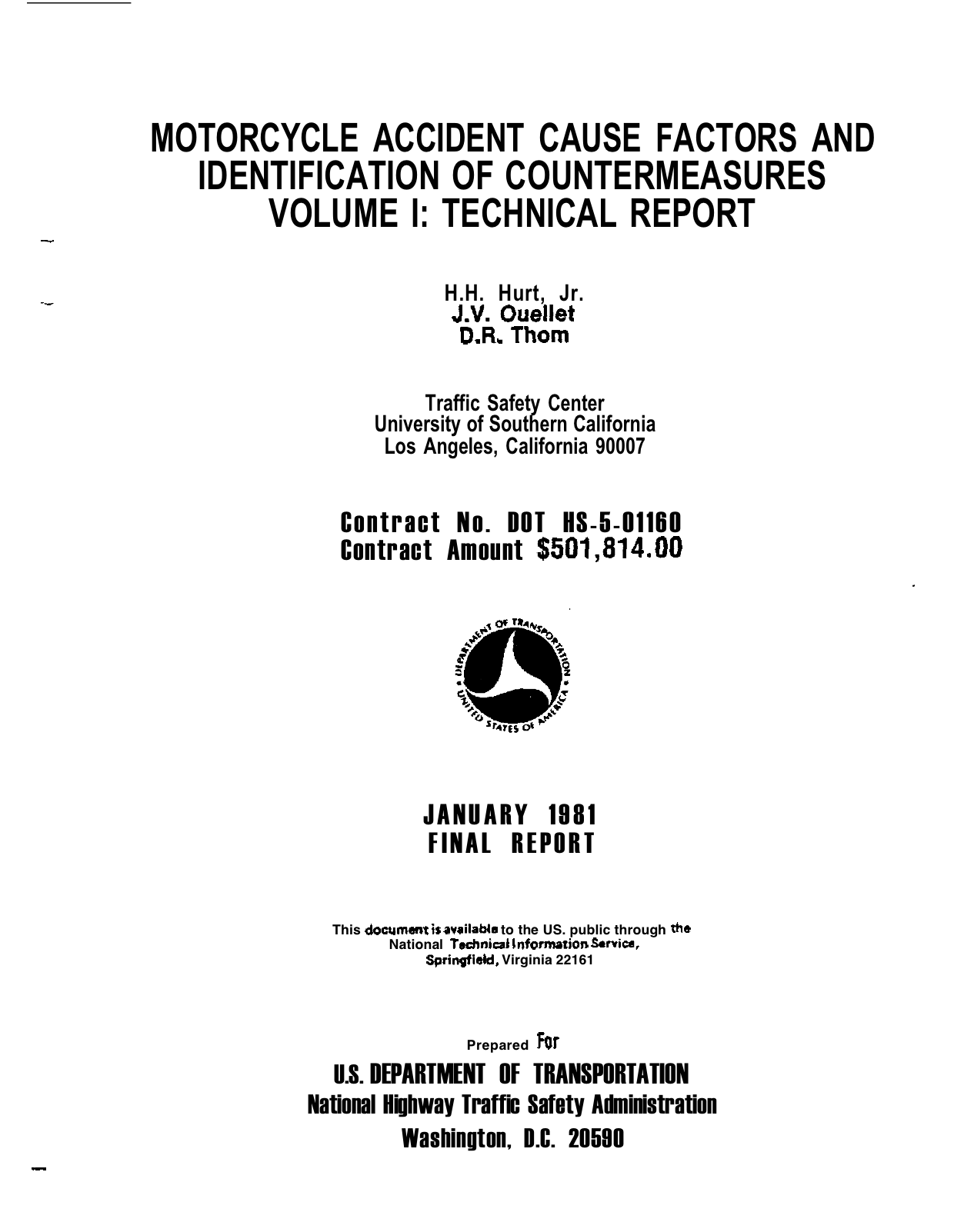
Example of a front page of a report

A report is a document or a statement that presents information in an organized format for a specific audience and purpose. Although summaries of reports may be delivered orally, complete reports are usually given in the form of written documents. Typically reports relay information that was found or observed. The credible report enhances the previous beliefs while dishonest information can question the agency preparing the report. Reports from IPCC as IPCC reports, World Health Report and Global Gender Gap Report from World Economic Forums are few examples of reports highlighting important worldly affairs.

== Usage ==
In a modern business scenario, reports play a major role in the progress of business. Reports are the backbone of the thinking process of the establishment and they are responsible, to a great extent, for evolving an efficient or inefficient work environment.

The significance of the reports includes:

- Reports present adequate information on various aspects of the business.
- All the skills and the knowledge of the professionals are communicated through reports.
- Reports help the top line in decision making.
- A clear and balanced report also helps in problem solving.
- Reports communicate the planning, policies and other matters regarding an organization to the masses. News reports play the role of ombudsman and levy checks and balances on the establishment.

== Attributes ==
One of the most common formats for presenting reports is IMRAD—introduction, methods, results, and discussion. This structure, standard for the genre, mirrors traditional publication of scientific research and summons the ethos and credibility of that discipline. Reports are not required to follow this pattern and may use alternative methods such as the problem-solution format, wherein the author first lists an issue and then details what must be done to fix the problem. Transparency and a focus on quality are keys to writing a useful report. Accuracy is also important. Faulty numbers in a financial report could lead to disastrous consequences.

== Standard elements ==
Reports use features such as tables, graphics, pictures, voice, or specialized vocabulary in order to persuade a specific audience to undertake an action or inform the reader of the subject at hand. Some common elements of written reports include headings to indicate topics and help the reader locate relevant information quickly, and visual elements such as charts, tables and figures, which are useful for breaking up large sections of text and making complex issues more accessible. Lengthy written reports will almost always contain a table of contents, appendices, footnotes, and references. A bibliography or list of references will appear at the end of any credible report and citations are often included within the text itself. Complex terms are explained within the body of the report or listed as footnotes in order to make the report easier to follow. A short summary of the report's contents, called an abstract, may appear in the beginning so that the audience knows what the report will cover. Online reports often contain hyperlinks to internal or external sources as well.

Verbal reports differ from written reports in the minutiae of their format, but they still educate or advocate for a course of action. Quality reports will be well researched and the speaker will list their sources if at all possible.

== Structure of a report ==
A typical report would include the following sections in it:

- Title page
- Executive summary
- Table of contents
- Introduction
- Discussion or body
- Conclusion
- Recommendations
- Reference list
- Appendices

== Types ==
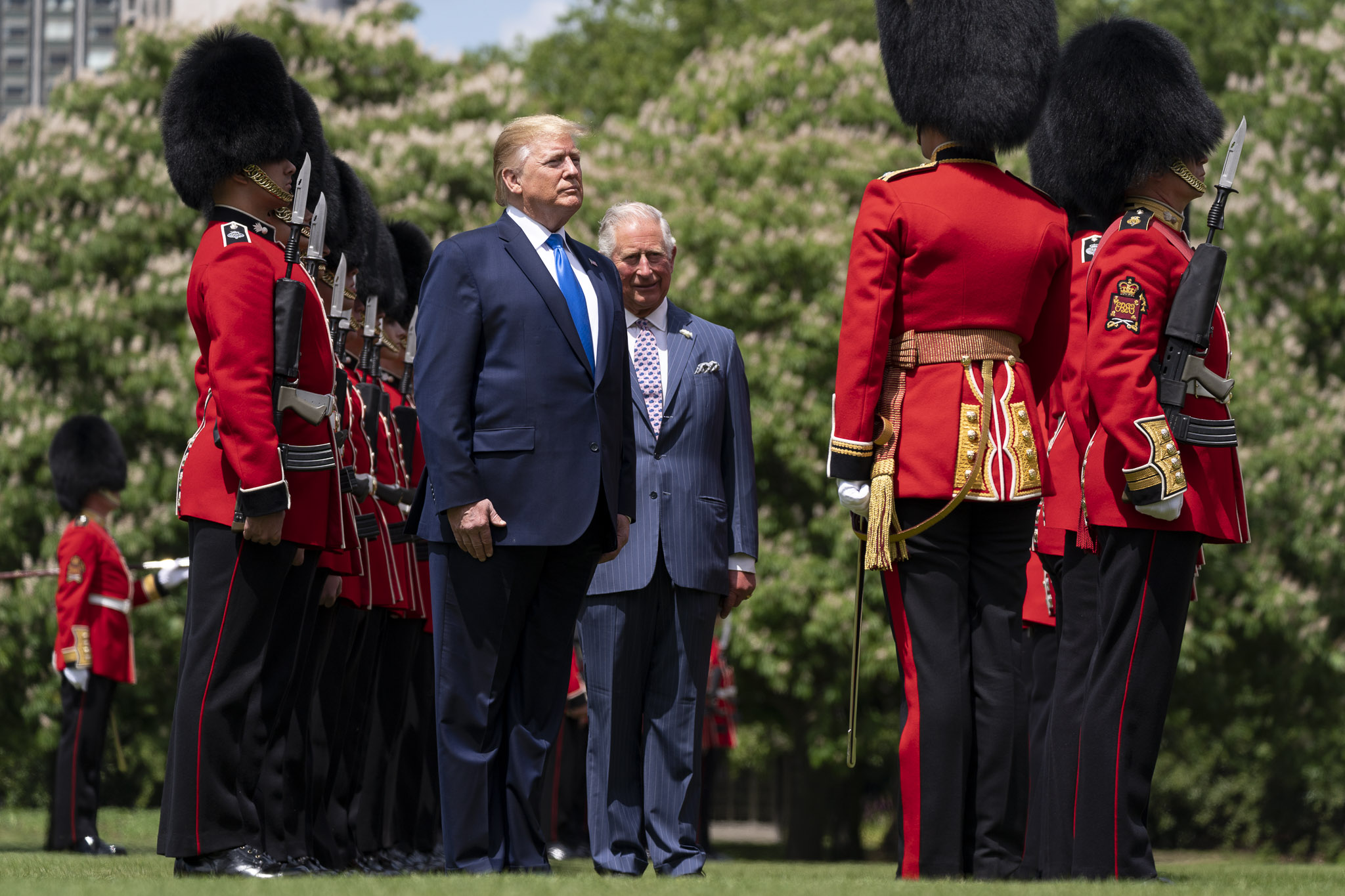
US President Donald Trump hears the military report from the commander of the 1st Battalion, Grenadier Guards.

Some examples of reports are:

- Annual reports
- Auditor's reports
- Book reports
- Bound report
- Retail report
- Census reports
- Credit reports
- Demographic reports
- Expense report
- Experience report
- Incident report
- Inspection reports
- Military reports
- Police reports
- Policy reports
- Informal reports
- Progress reports
- Investigative reports
- Technical or scientific reports
- Trip reports
- White papers
- Appraisal reports
- Workplace reports

== See also ==
- List of environmental reports
- Customer relationship management
- Data quality
- Decision support system
- Enterprise application integration
- Enterprise resource planning
- Global Reporting Initiative
- Grey Literature International Steering Committee – International guidelines for the production of scientific and technical reports
- Management information system
