= NERAC =

Nerac, Inc.
- Company type: Private
- Industry: Research and Advisory
- Founded: Storrs, Connecticut (1966)
- Founder: Dr. Daniel Wilde
- Headquarters: Tolland, Connecticut
- Key people: Kevin Bouley
- Products: Advisory Services
- Revenue: Not reported
- Number of employees: 100+
- Website: www.nerac.com

Nerac, Inc. is a research and advisory firm for companies developing products and technologies. Nerac is located in Tolland, Connecticut, US.

The company was founded in 1966 by Daniel Wilde, a professor of computer science at the University of Connecticut (UConn). Nerac began operating in 1966 as the New England Research Application Center, an experimental collaboration between the University of Connecticut and the National Aeronautics & Space Administration (NASA). In 1985, Nerac separated from the University of Connecticut and incorporated under the name Nerac, Inc. Having succeeded in its NASA-sponsored mission, Nerac severed its ties with NASA in 1991. An article by NASA Exploring the Unknown talks about the benefits of NASA "Spinoff" technology. Currently, Nerac provides clients access to analysts who serve as advisors and deliver custom assessments of product and technology development opportunities, competitive threats, intellectual property strategies, compliance requirements, and scientific review and problem-solving.

Nerac Analysts come from a wide variety of business, scientific and technical backgrounds.

Nerac also acts as an information aggregator for scientific and technical databases.
