= National Technical Reports Library =

- Producer: National Technical Information Service (United States)
- History: 2009 to present
- Languages: English

Access
- Cost: free

Coverage
- Record depth: Index, abstract & full-text
- Format coverage: Technical reports
- No. of records: over 3 million

Links
- Website: ntrl.ntis.gov/NTRL/

The National Technical Reports Library (NTRL) was created by the National Technical Information Service (NTIS), an agency of the U.S. Department of Commerce, as a means of disseminating federally-funded scientific, technical, engineering, and business information.

Previously a subscription-based service, the NTRL re-launched as a public, open-access website on October 1, 2016, allowing free access to three million records and abstracts in its bibliographic database and over 800,000 digitized full-text reports.
