= Grey literature =

Documents and research not produced for commercial or academic journal purposes

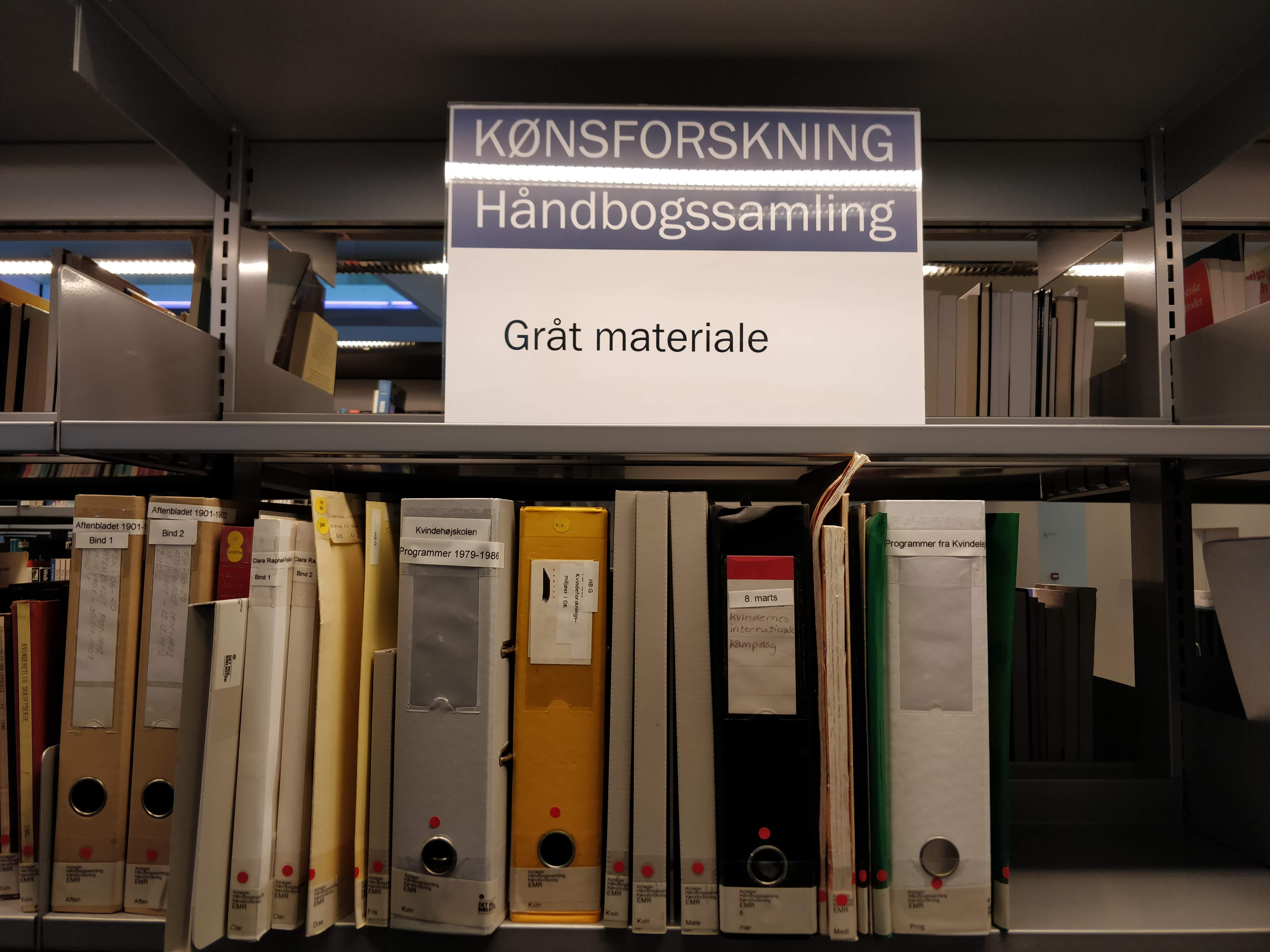
A library shelf stocked with grey literature relevant to the field of gender studies such as women's college programs and papers from International Women's Day events.

Grey literature (or gray literature) is material and research produced by organizations outside of the traditional commercial or academic publishing and distribution channels. Common grey literature publication types include reports (annual, research, technical, project, etc.), working papers, blog posts, government documents, white papers and evaluations. Organizations that produce grey literature include government departments and agencies, civil society or non-governmental organizations, academic centres and departments, and private companies and consultants.

Grey literature may be difficult to discover, access and evaluate, but this can be addressed through the formulation of sound search strategies. Grey literature may be made available to the public or distributed privately within organizations or groups, and may lack a systematic means of distribution and collection. The standard of quality, review, and production of grey literature can vary considerably.

Although the concept is difficult to define, the term grey literature is an agreed collective term that researchers and information professionals can use to discuss this distinct but disparate group of resources. Other terms used for this material include report literature, government publications, policy documents, fugitive literature, non-conventional literature, unpublished literature, non-traditional publications and ephemeral publications.

== Definitions ==
While a hazy definition of grey literature had existed previously, the term is generally understood to have been coined by the researcher Charles P. Auger, who wrote Use of Reports Literature in 1975. The literature he referred to consisted of intelligence reports and notes on atomic research produced in vast quantities by the Allied Forces during World War II. In a conference held by the British Lending Library Division in 1978, Auger used the term "grey literature" to describe the concept for the first time. His concepts focused upon a "vast body of documents" of "continuing increasing quantity" that were characterized by the "difficulty it presents to the librarian". Auger described the documentation as having great ambiguity between ephemerality and durability, and by a growing impact on scientific research. While acknowledging the challenges of reports literature, he recognized that it held a number of advantages "over other means of dissemination, including greater speed, greater flexibility and the opportunity to go into considerable detail if necessary". Auger considered reports a "half-published" communication medium with a "complex interrelationship [to] scientific journals". In 1989 Auger published the second edition of The Documentation of the European Communities: A Guide, which contained the first usage of the term "grey literature" in a published work.

The "Luxembourg definition", discussed and approved at the Third International Conference on Grey Literature in 1997, defined grey literature as "that which is produced on all levels of government, academics, business and industry in print and electronic formats, but which is not controlled by commercial publishers". In 2004, at the Sixth Conference in New York City, a postscript was added to the definition for purposes of clarification: grey literature is "...not controlled by commercial publishers, i.e., where publishing is not the primary activity of the producing body". This definition is now widely accepted by the scholarly community.

The U.S. Interagency Gray Literature Working Group (IGLWG), in its "Gray Information Functional Plan" of 1995, defined grey literature as "foreign or domestic open source material that usually is available through specialized channels and may not enter normal channels or systems of publication, distribution, bibliographic control, or acquisition by booksellers or subscription agents". Thus grey literature is usually inaccessible through relevant reference tools such as databases and indexes, which rely upon the reporting of subscription agents.

In 2010, D.J. Farace and J. Schöpfel pointed out that existing definitions of grey literature were predominantly economic, and argued that in a changing research environment, with new channels of scientific communication, grey literature needed a new conceptual framework. They proposed the "Prague definition" as follows:

Grey literature stands for manifold document types produced on all levels of government, academics, business and industry in print and electronic formats that are protected by intellectual property rights, of sufficient quality to be collected and preserved by library holdings or institutional repositories, but not controlled by commercial publishers i.e., where publishing is not the primary activity of the producing body.

The rapid growth of web publishing and expanded access to documents have shifted the focus of grey literature research to quality, intellectual property, curation, and accessibility.

== Publication types ==
The term grey literature acts as a collective noun to refer to a large number of publications types produced by organizations for various reasons. These include research and project reports, annual or activity reports, theses, conference proceedings, preprints, working papers, newsletters, technical reports, recommendations and technical standards, patents, technical notes, data and statistics, presentations, field notes, laboratory research books, academic courseware, lecture notes, evaluations, and many more. The international network GreyNet maintains an online listing of document types.

Organizations produce grey literature as a means of encapsulating, storing and sharing information for their own use, and for wider distribution. This can take the form of a record of data and information on a site or project (archaeological records, survey data, working papers); sharing information on how and why things occurred (technical reports and specifications, briefings, evaluations, project reports); describing and advocating for changes to public policy, practice or legislation (white papers, discussion papers, submissions); meeting statutory or other requirements for information sharing or management (annual reports, consultation documents); and many other reasons.

Organizations are often looking to create the required output, sharing it with relevant parties quickly and easily, without the delays and restrictions of academic journal and book publishing. Often there is little incentive or justification for organizations or individuals to publish in academic journals and books, and often no need to charge for access to organizational outputs. Indeed, some information organizations may be required to make certain information and documents public. On the other hand, grey literature is not necessarily always free, with some resources, such as market reports, selling for thousands of dollars. However, this is the exception and on the whole grey literature, while costly to produce, is usually made available for free.

While research and production quality may be extremely high (with organizational reputation vested in the end product), the producing body, not being a formal publisher, generally lacks the channels for extensive distribution and bibliographic control.

Information and research professionals generally draw a distinction between ephemera and grey literature. However, there are certain overlaps between the two media and they undoubtedly share common frustrations such as bibliographic control issues. Unique written documents such as manuscripts, archives and personal communications are not usually considered to fall under the heading of grey literature, although they again share some of the same problems of control and access.

== Impact ==
The relative importance of grey literature is largely dependent on research disciplines and subjects, on methodological approaches, and on the sources they use. In some fields, especially in the life sciences and medical sciences, there has been a traditional preference for only using peer-reviewed academic journals, but studies of methodological quality and reliability have found that "reliability of published research works in several fields may be decreasing with increasing journal rank", contrary to widespread expectations. In other fields, such as agriculture, aeronautics and the engineering sciences in general, grey literature resources tend to predominate. In the last few decades, systematic literature reviews in health and medicine have established the importance of discovering and analyzing grey literature as part of the evidence base and in order to avoid publication bias.

Grey literature is particularly important as a means of distributing scientific and technical and public policy and practice information. Professionals insist on its importance for two main reasons: research results are often more detailed in reports, doctoral theses and conference proceedings than in journals, and they are distributed in these forms up to 12 or even 18 months before being published elsewhere. Some results simply are not published anywhere else.

In particular, public administrations and public and industrial research laboratories produce a great deal of "grey" material, often for internal and in some cases "restricted" dissemination. The notion of evidence-based policy has also seen some recognition of the importance of grey literature as part of the evidence base; however, the term is not yet widely used in public policy and the social sciences more broadly.

== Problems ==
For a number of reasons, discovery, access, evaluation and curation of grey literature pose a number of difficulties, even for library science. Generally, grey literature lacks any strict or meaningful bibliographic control. Basic information such as authors, publication dates and publishing or corporate bodies may not be easily identified. Similarly, the nonprofessional layouts and formats, low print runs and non-conventional channels of distribution make the organized collection of grey literature a challenge compared to journals and books. (Conversely, a peer reviewed journal with a web publication arm may include grey literature sections.)

Although grey literature is often discussed with reference to scientific research, it is by no means restricted to any one field. Outside the hard sciences, it presents significant challenges in archaeology where site surveys and excavation reports, containing unique data, have frequently been produced and circulated in informal "grey" formats.

Some of the problems of accessing grey literature have decreased since the late 1990s as government, professional, business and university bodies have increasingly published their reports and other official or review documents online. The informal nature of grey literature has meant that it has become more numerous as the technology that allows people to create documentation has improved. Less expensive and more sophisticated printers increased the ease of creating grey literature. And the ability to post documents on the internet has resulted in a tremendous boom. The impact of this trend has been greatly boosted since the early 2000s, as the growth of major search engines has made retrieving grey literature simultaneously easier and more cluttered. Grey reports are thus far more easily found online than they were, often at no cost to access. Most users of reports and other grey documents have migrated to using online copies, and efforts by libraries to collect hard-copy versions have generally declined in consequence.

However, many problems remain because originators often fail to produce online reports or publications to an adequate bibliographic standard (often omitting a publication date, for instance). Documents are often not assigned permanent URLs or DOI numbers, or stored in electronic depositories, so that link rot can develop within citations, reference lists, databases and websites. Copyright law and the copyrighted status of many reports inhibits their downloading and electronic storage, and there is a lack of large scale collecting of digital grey literature. Securing long-term access to and management of grey literature in the digital era thus remains a considerable problem.

The amount of digital grey literature now available also poses a problem for finding relevant resources and to be able to assess their credibility and quality given the number of resources now available. At the same time a great deal of grey literature remains hidden, either not made public or not made discoverable via search engines.

== Databases ==
The STAR NLP Framework for Grey Literature

Various databases and libraries collect and make available print and digital grey literature; however, the cost and difficulty of finding and cataloguing grey literature means that it is still difficult to find large collections. The British Library began collecting print grey literature in the post-WWII period and now has an extensive collection of print resources. Analysis & Policy Observatory has an extensive collection of grey literature on a wide range of public policy issues, ArXiv is a collection of preprints on physics and other sciences, and RePEc is a collection of economics working papers. Policy Commons, launched in 2021, indexes and preserves grey literature across the social sciences produced by IGOs, NGOs, think tanks, government agencies, and cities. At the end of 2025, it indexed 30 million items. A sister platform, Applied Science Commons, launched in 2024, indexes and preserves technical content from research centres, government agencies, and companies.

Many university libraries provide subject guides that give information on grey literature and suggestions for databases. ROAR and OpenDOAR are directories of open access institutional repositories and subject repositories, many of which contain some grey literature. Several academic search engines exist to combine the open data provided by such open archives through OAI-PMH, as well as records from publishers deposited in CrossRef and other sources. They include BASE, CORE and Unpaywall, which indexes over 20 million open access publications as of 2020.

== Resources and advocacy ==
The annual international grey literature conference series has been organized since 1993 by the Europe-based organization GreyNet. Research in this field of information has been systematically documented and archived via the International Conference on Grey Literature series.

Greynet also produces a journal on grey literature and has been a key advocate for the recognition and study of grey literature, particularly in library and information sciences, The Grey Journal. The Grey Journal appears three times a year – in spring, summer and autumn. Each issue in a volume is thematic and deals with one or more related topics in the field of grey literature. The Grey Journal appears both in print and electronic formats. The electronic version on article level is available via EBSCO's LISTA-FT Database (EBSCO Publishing). The Grey Journal is indexed by Scopus and others.

On 16 May 2014, the Pisa Declaration on Policy Development for Grey Literature Resources was ratified and published.

== See also ==
- Alternative media
- European Association for Grey Literature Exploitation
- Grey Literature International Steering Committee
- Grey Literature Network Service
- OpenSIGLE
- Paraliterature
- Self-publishing
- System for Information on Grey Literature in Europe
