= Institut de l'information scientifique et technique =

French research Institute

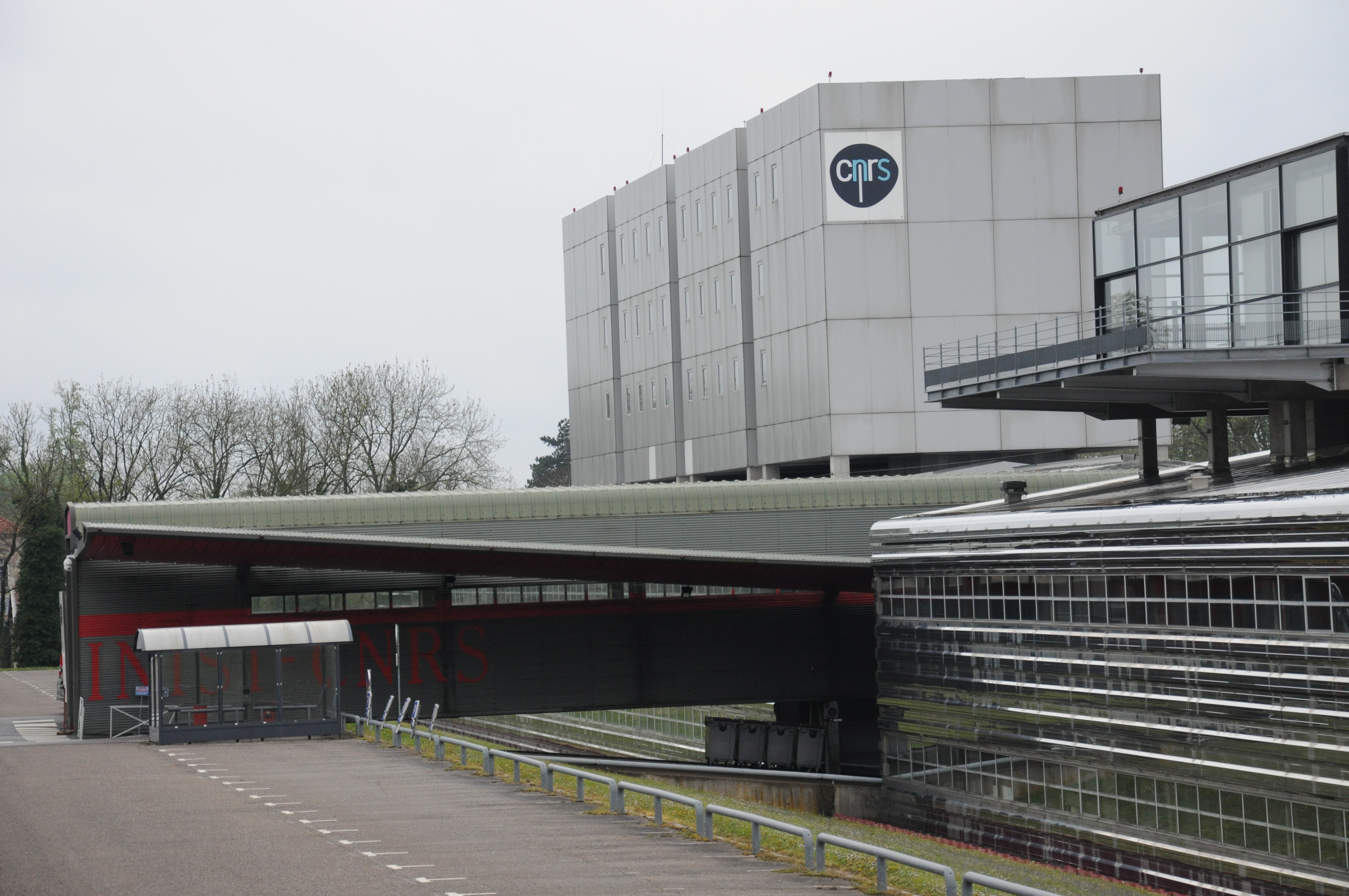
Building of the Institute of Scientific and Technical Information

The Institut de l'information scientifique et technique, or INIST (English: Institute of Scientific and Technical Information) is the CNRS centre of documentation located in France. It has as mission to collect, treat and diffuse results of scientific and technical research. The INIST produces three bibliographic multilingual and multidisciplinary databases: PASCAL, FRANCIS, and DOGE. It is based at Vandœuvre-lès-Nancy, in a building designed by Jean Nouvel. In addition, INIST publishes a number of electronic journals.

== Directors ==
- Goéry Delacôte
