= Derek J. de Solla Price =

British physicist and science historian (1922–1983)

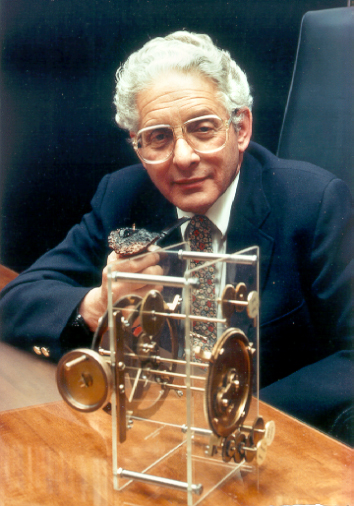
- Derek de Solla Price with a model of the Antikythera mechanism
- Born: 22 January 1922; Leyton, England
- Died: 3 September 1983 (aged 61); London, England
- Known for: Scientometrics; Price's model
- Spouse: Ellen Hjorth (m. 1947)
- Children: 3, including Mark
- Awards: John Desmond Bernal Prize (1981)
- Scientific career
- Workplaces: University of London; University of Cambridge; Institute for Advanced Study; Yale University
- Doctoral students: Lawrence Badash

Derek John de Solla Price (22 January 1922 – 3 September 1983) was a British physicist, historian of science, and information scientist. He was known for his investigation of the Antikythera mechanism, an ancient Greek planetary computer, and for quantitative studies on scientific publications, which led to his being described as the "Herald of scientometrics".

== Biography ==
Price was born in Leyton, England, to Philip Price, a tailor, and Fanny de Solla, a singer. He began work in 1938 as an assistant in a physics laboratory at the South West Essex Technical College, before studying Physics and Mathematics at the University of London, where he received a Bachelor of Science in 1942. He then worked as an assistant to Harry Lowery carrying out research on hot and molten metals, and working towards a London external Ph.D. in experimental physics, which he obtained in 1946. This work led to several research papers and to a patent for an emissive-correcting optical pyrometer. He then went to the USA on a Commonwealth Fund fellowship, working in Pittsburgh and Princeton, returning to England in 1947. He was married that year to Ellen Hjorth in Copenhagen.

In 1948 Price took a three-year position as a teacher of applied mathematics at Raffles College, Singapore, which was to become part of the National University of Singapore. There he met C. Northcote Parkinson, the naval historian, who stimulated a love of history in Price that would change the direction of his career. While in Singapore, he formulated his theory on the exponential growth of science. He was looking after the university's complete run of the Philosophical Transactions of the Royal Society, while Raffles College had its library built. He started reading these, and as he placed the volumes in chronological order he noticed that their yearly height increased exponentially with time. This led to a presentation at the Sixth International Congress of the History of Science in Amsterdam, in 1950.

Returning to England, Price decided to make a career in the history of science, and enrolled for a second Ph.D. at the University of Cambridge, supported by an ICI fellowship. He had initially intended to work on a survey of scientific instruments, but during his studies he discovered The Equatorie of the Planetis, a Peterhouse manuscript in Cambridge University Library. The manuscript, written in Middle English, describes an Equatorium, an astronomical calculating instrument, and became the basis of the thesis for his PhD, which he obtained in 1954, and also for a book, published the following year. He believed the work to be by Geoffrey Chaucer, who had written A Treatise on the Astrolabe, but it is now attributed to a St Albans monk called John Westwyk.

Price received a Nuffield Foundation award for research in the History of science, which enabled him to work on scientific instruments during 1955–1956. He first prepared a catalogue of the instrument collection of the British Museum, and then a catalogue of all the ancient astrolabes that he was able to locate.

While working on his Ph.D. in Cambridge, Price met Joseph Needham, the historian of Chinese science. As a result of his work on the Equatorium Price was invited to participate in a project on medieval Chinese astronomical clocks. This led to the book Heavenly Clockwork by Needham, Wang Ling and Price, which was published in 1960.

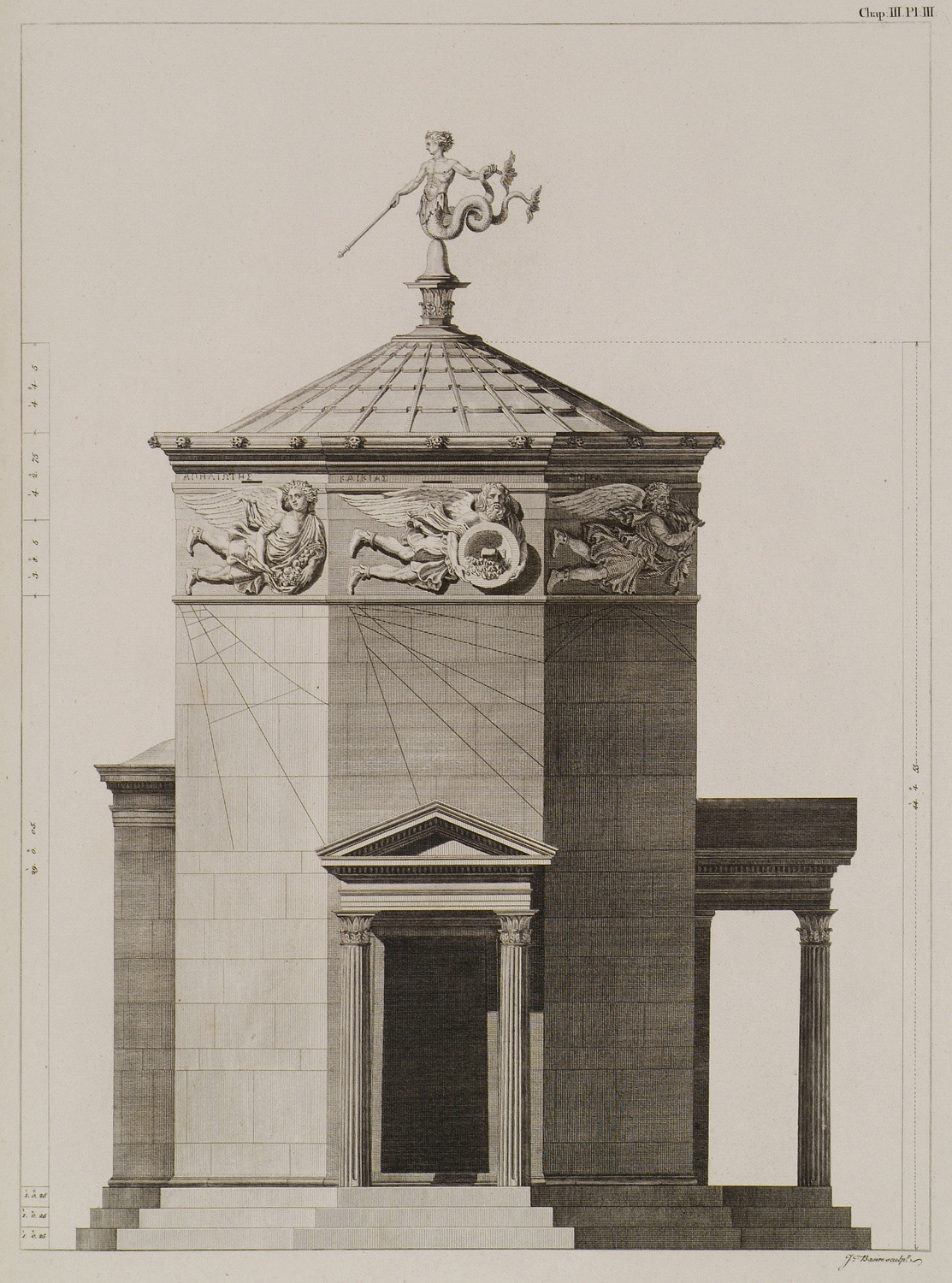
An engraving of the Tower of the Winds in Athens. A 1762 illustration reproduced by Noble and Price (1968)

Another interest in ancient technology concerned the Antikythera mechanism. This machine had been retrieved from a wreck off the Greek island of Antikythera in 1900, and its function had remained unknown. Price started working on this in the 1950s, and continued on and off for twenty years using various techniques including gamma radiography. He published two papers on the mechanism, in 1959 and 1974, showing that it was a planetary computer, dating from about 80 BCE. Also, with Joseph Noble, he studied the machinery of the Tower of the Winds in Athens, and showed it to be water-driven clockwork, showing times and seasons.

Around 1950, Price adopted his mother's Sephardic name, "de Solla", as a middle name. He was a "British Atheist ... from a rather well-known Sephardic Jewish family", and although his Danish wife, Ellen, had been christened as a Lutheran, he did not, according to their son Mark, regard their marriage as "mixed", because they were both atheists.

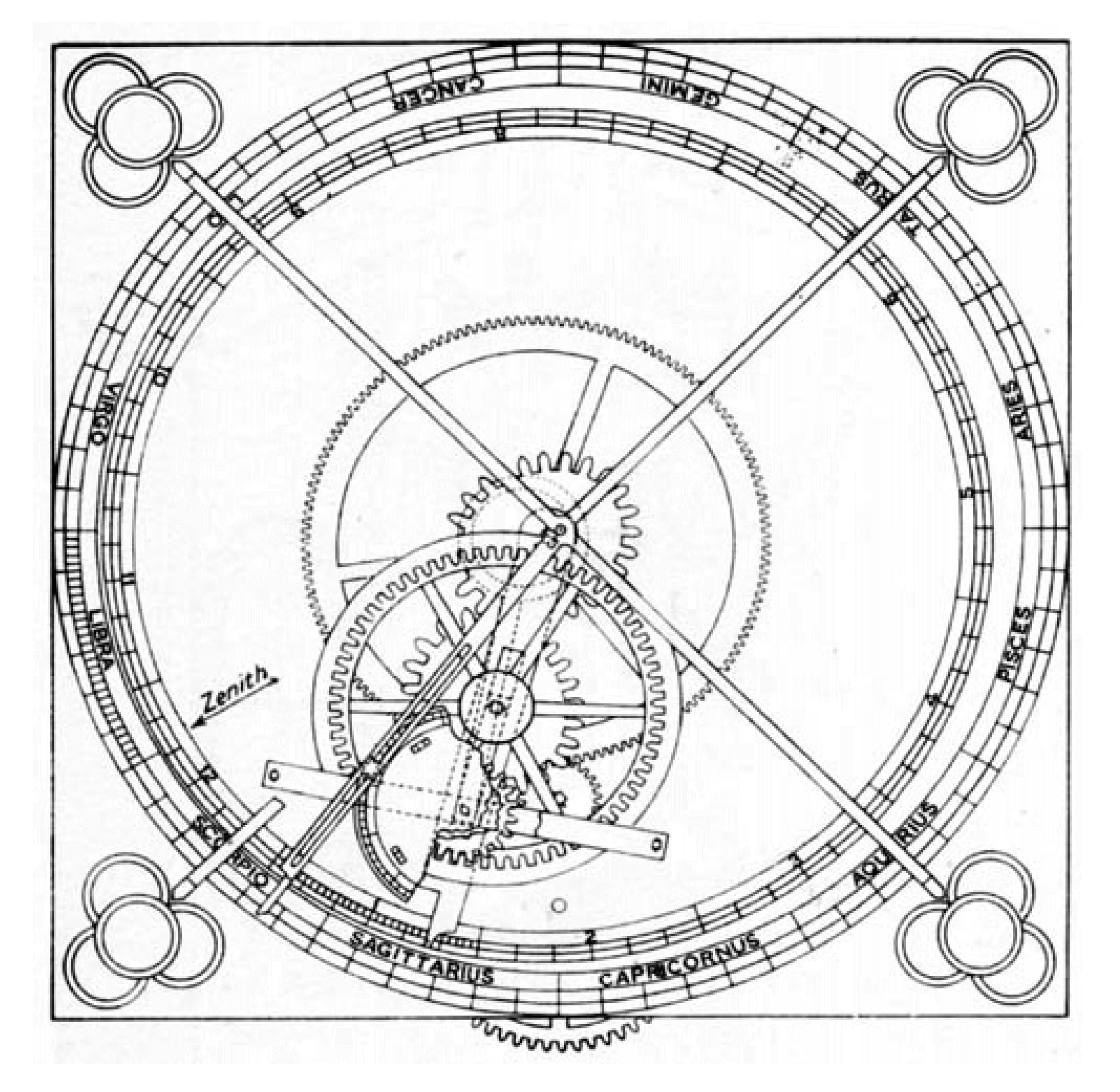
Part of the mechanism of the 14th-century De Dondi Clock, from a Bulletin of the Smithsonian Institution (1959)

After obtaining his second doctorate, Price found advancement difficult in England. One colleague alleged that Price, who came from a lower-class background, was "not socially house-trained," and he suspected that he was turned down for university positions for personal reasons. Price decided to move to the United States. In 1957 he became a consultant to the Smithsonian Institution, and then a fellow at the Institute for Advanced Study in Princeton, New Jersey. At Princeton he studied ancient astronomy with Otto Neugebauer. In 1959 he joined the Department of History at Yale University initially as a one-year visitor. He would remain at Yale for the rest of his life.

Price gave a series of lectures in Yale in 1959, which formed the basis for a book, Science since Babylon (1961). In 1960, a Department of History of Science and Medicine was formed at Yale, largely through the efforts of John Fulton who had been Professor of the History of Medicine since 1951. Price became Professor of the History of Science, and on Fulton's death in 1960 became chairman of the department. In 1962 he became the Avalon Professor of the History of Science.

The quantitative study of science, Scientometrics, and its application to science policy, became the principal focus of Price's work from the 1960s onwards. In 1963 his best-known book Little Science, Big Science was published. Early in that year, he met Eugene Garfield, founder of the Science Citation Index (SCI), and formed a lasting collaboration. SCI would provide most of the data for his quantitative work, allowing studies not just of the quantity of scientific publication, but, for example, of the impact of those publications, and of the duration of that impact. In 1965, Price gave the first Science of Science Foundation lecture, entitled The Scientific Foundations of Science Policy, given at the Royal Institution in London. He argued that as science grew exponentially it presented new challenges to policy-makers, and that they could be helped by the kind of Scientometric work he was carrying out and promoting. Clearly exponential growth cannot continue indefinitely, and the slowing of growth rates will correspond to pressing issues around allocation of resources. He also emphasised the critical importance of communication, referring to the "invisible college", a network of scientific communication that exists outside formal channels. The lecture was reviewed at length in the journal Nature.

Price died of a heart attack at the home of his oldest friend, Anthony Michaelis, in London, during a visit to attend the wedding of his niece. He was survived by his wife, Ellen, and their three children, Linda, Jeffrey, and Mark.

In 1984, Price received, posthumously, the ASIS Research Award for outstanding contributions in the field of information science.

Since 1984, the Derek de Solla Price Memorial Medal is awarded by the International Society for Scientometrics and Informetrics to scientists with outstanding contributions to the fields of quantitative studies of science.

== Scientific contributions ==
Price's major scientific contributions include:

- Price's law, on the topic of authors publishing academic literature, proposed that half of the publications come from the square root of all authors. For example, if 100 papers are written by 25 authors, then $\sqrt{25}=5$ out of the 25 authors will have contributed 50 papers. However, empirical data suggest that Price's law is a poor fit, while the related Lotka's law (Note: Mathematically, Price's law and Lotka's law are neither contradictory, nor does either imply the other without additional assumptions.) is a good fit;
- Studies of the exponential growth of science and the half-life of scientific literature;
- Quantitative studies of the network of citations between scientific papers (Price 1965), including the discovery that both the in- and out-degrees of a citation network have power-law distributions, making this the first published example of a scale-free network;
- Price's model, a mathematical theory of the growth of citation networks, based on what would now be called a preferential attachment process (Price 1976). This is closely related to the Matthew effect;
- An analysis of the Antikythera mechanism, an ancient Greek analogue computer and astronomical instrument (Price 1959, 1974).
- A full bibliography is provided by Yagi et al. (1986)

== Selected publications ==
- Price, Derek J. (1947). "The temperature variation of the emissivity of metals in the near infra-red". Proceedings of the Physical Society. 59 (1): 131–138. Bibcode:1947PPS....59..131P. doi:10.1088/0959-5309/59/1/319.
- —— (1951). Quantitative measures of the development of science. Sixth International Congress of the History of Science, Amsterdam, 1950. Archives internationales d'histoire des sciences. Vol. 14. pp. 85–93.
- —— (1952). "The early observatory instruments of trinity college, Cambridge". Annals of Science. 8: 1–12. doi:10.1080/00033795200200012.
- —— (1952). Chaucer's astronomy (Weekly evening meeting offprint). Royal Institution of Great Britain.
- —— (1953). An Old Palmistry, Being the Earliest Known Book of Palmistry in English, Edited from the Bodleian Ms Digby Roll IV. W. Heffer. ASIN B000PIYKBW.
- —— (1955). 'The Equatorie of the Planetis': Edited from Peterhouse MS. 75.1. Cambridge University Press. ISBN 978-0521059947.
- —— (1955). "Medieval Land Surveying and Topographical Maps". The Geographical Journal. 121 (1): 1–7. Bibcode:1955GeogJ.121....1P. doi:10.2307/1791800. JSTOR 1791800.
- —— (1955). An International Checklist of Astrolabes. Peyronnet. ASIN B0007JKDJ2.
- —— (1957). Scientific Humanities: An Urgent Program. ASIN B0007KAV84.
- —— (1959). "On the origin of clockwork, perpetual motion devices, and the compass". Bulletin of the United States National Museum (218). Smithsonian Institution Press: 81–112. Reprinted 2019 by Good Press EAN 4057664653352.
- —— (1959). "An Ancient Greek Computer". Scientific American. 200 (6): 60–67. Bibcode:1959SciAm.200f..60P. doi:10.1038/scientificamerican0659-60. JSTOR 26309507.
- —— (1959). Contra-Copernicus: A Critical Re-estimation of the Mathematical Planetary Theory of Ptolemy, Copernicus, and Kepler. ASIN B0007KCWS6.
- —— (1960). The Little Ship of Venice: A Middle English instrument tract. Vol. 15. pp. 399–407. ASIN B0007JV620. doi:10.1093/jhmas/xv.4.399. PMID 13737960.
- —— (1962). "Mechanical Waterclocks of the 14th Century in Fez, Morocco". Proceedings of the Tenth International Congress of the History of Science (Ithaca, N.Y). Paris: Hermann. pp. 599–602.
- —— (1963). Little Science, Big Science. New York: Columbia University Press. ISBN 978-0-231-08562-5. See review Garfield, E. (1985). "In Tribute to Derek John De Solla Price: A Citation Analysis of Little Science, Big Science". Scientometrics. 7 (3): 487–503. doi:10.1007/BF02017163. S2CID 35486836..
- —— (1964). "Ethics of Scientific Publication". Science. 144 (3619): 655–657. Bibcode:1964Sci...144..655D. doi:10.1126/science.144.3619.655. PMID 17806989.
- —— (1965). "Networks of Scientific Papers". Science. 149 (3683): 510–515. Bibcode:1965Sci...149..510D. doi:10.1126/science.149.3683.510. PMID 14325149.
- —— (1975). Science since Babylon. New Haven, Conn: Yale University Press. ISBN 978-0-300-01797-7. see review
- —— (1967). "Nations can Publish or Perish". Science and Technology. 70: 84–90.
- —— (1968). The Differences between Science and Technology. Thomas Alva Edison Foundation. ASIN B0007HNK3U.
- —— (1969). Portable Sundials in antiquity: Including an account of a new example from Aphrodisias. ASIN B0007K65O8.
- —— (1969). Measuring the Size of Science. Israel Academy of Sciences and Humanities. ASIN B007EMQHT0.
- —— (1970). "Citation Measures of Hard Science, Soft Science, Technology, and Nonscience". In Nelson, C.E.; Pollock, D.K. (eds.). Communication among Scientists and Engineers. Lexington, Massachusetts: D.C. Heath and Company. pp. 3–22.
- —— (1974). Gears from the Greeks. The Antikythera Mechanism: A Calendar Computer from ca. 80 B.C. New Series. Vol. 64. pp. 1–70. doi:10.2307/1006146. ISBN 978-0871696472. JSTOR 1006146.
- —— (1976). "A general theory of bibliometric and other cumulative advantage processes". Journal of the American Society for Information Science. 27 (5): 292–306. CiteSeerX 10.1.1.161.114. doi:10.1002/asi.4630270505. S2CID 8536863. (Winner of 1976 JASIS paper award.)
- —— (1978). "Editorial statements". Scientometrics. 1 (1): 3–8. doi:10.1007/BF02016836. S2CID 12528125.
- Needham, Joseph; Wang, Ling; Price, Derek J.De Solla (1960). Heavenly clockwork: the great astronomical clocks of medieval China. Cambridge University Press. Second edition 1986; with supplement 2008: ISBN 9780521087162.
- Noble, Joseph V.; Price, Derek, J.de Solla (1968). "The Water Clock in the Tower of the Winds". American Journal of Archaeology. 72 (4): 345–355. doi:10.2307/503828. JSTOR 503828. S2CID 193112893.
- Spiegel-Rösing, Ina-Susanne; Price, Derek J.De Solla (1977). Science, Technology, and Society: A Cross-disciplinary Perspective. SAGE Publications. ISBN 9780803998582.

== See also ==
- Equatorium
- A Treatise on the Astrolabe
