= BnF Latin 7478 =

Medieval calendar

BNF Latin 7478
- Bibliothèque nationale de France
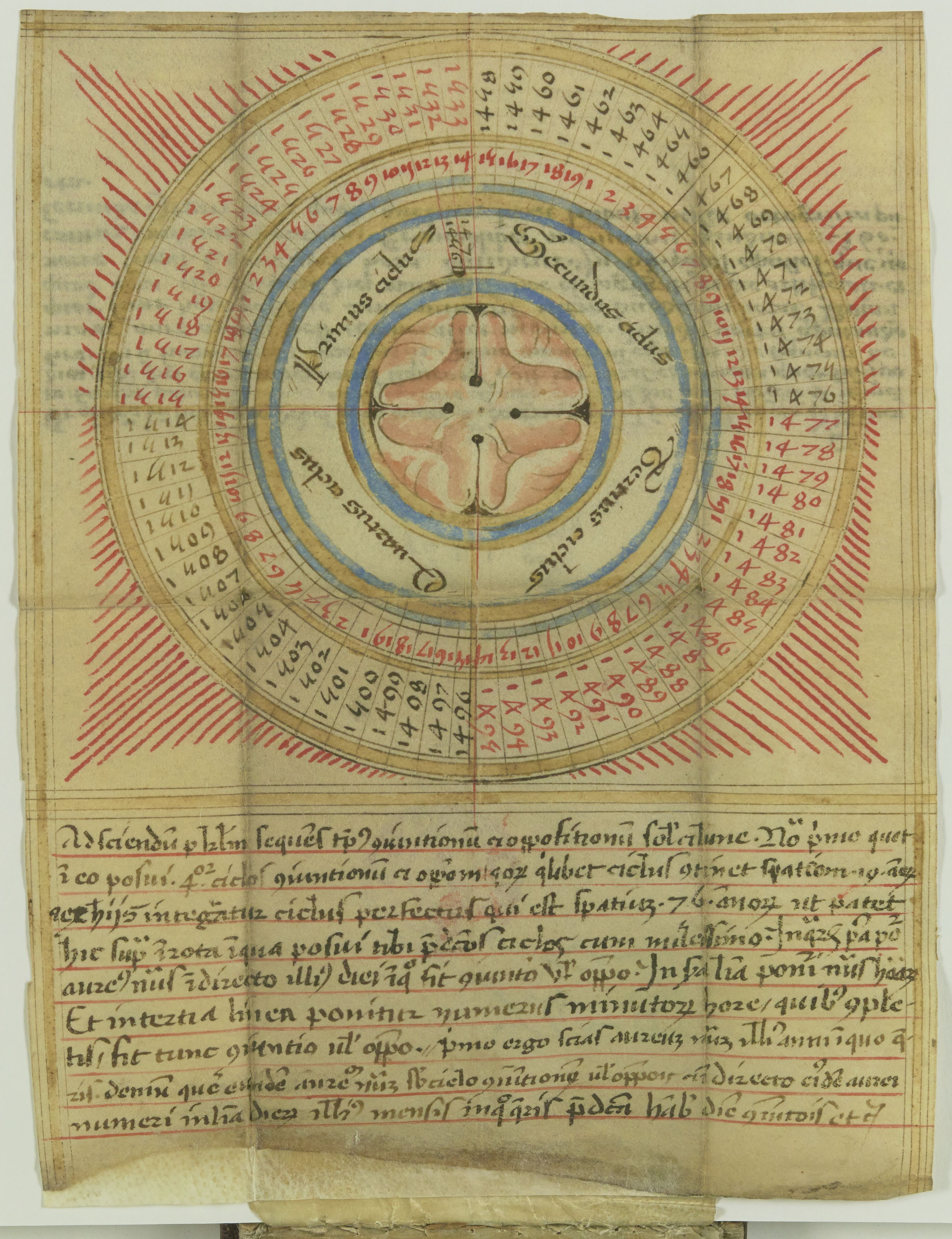
- BNF Latin 7478 first folio
- Type: Calendar
- Date: XV century (25 septembre 1456)
- Place of origin: Northern Italy
- Language: Latin
- Scribe(s): Paul of Kignin & Unknown
- Author: John of Gmunden
- Size: 195×220 mm in the unfolded form (compartments 95×70 mm
- Format: Bat book

Latin 7478 (former shelfmark Gaignières 73) is a medieval astronomical manuscript preserved as a part of the Latin collection in Bibliothèque nationale de France. It is an elaborated and amended version of John of Gmunden’s Kalendarium (Calendar), a widespread cyclic calendar used to get reliable syzygy times for liturgical and astrological purposes. One of the key features of this manuscript is its codicological format: in contrast to the traditional codex, organised in quires, Latin 7478 is composed of individual folded leaves attached together, which are to be unfolded and read from the outer edge to the stub. This type of codex has received the name of “bat-book” by Johan Peter Gumbert.

== The history of “bat-books” ==
The term “bat-book”, proposed by Johan Peter Gumbert in 2016, is used to describe a codex due to its specific codicological structure: while typical manuscript, like modern books, are bound in quires, “bat-books” are composed of individual folded leaves attached together, which are to be unfolded and read from the outer edge to the stub. The first evidence of “bat-books” are found in the XIII century and are not dedicated specifically to the astronomical subjects: some of the early “bat-book” examples contain texts of medical, theological or philosophical nature. They have most likely been produced to face the needs of a traveler of any profession. However, due to its difficult production and high fragility, this type of codices hasn't gained popularity and has been replaced by easier-to-make pocket books. By the XIV and XV centuries, the main type of content for which “bat-books” were still produced were calendars. They provided instructions for calculating the golden number or the date of Easter) or almanachs containing tables for astrological computation. This manuscript falls in both of those categories.

== Codicology and palaeography ==
Latin 7478 consists of 17 folded leaves, perhaps previously attached to the tabs, but throughout the manuscript conservation it has obtained a new binding more like a traditional codex. It follows the pattern similar to what Johan Peter Gumbert calls H6r pattern: with the leaves opening on the top as well, then the first compartment unfolding the right, and only the last one on the left. Latin 7478 has been copied by Paul of Kignin (could be also read as Szignin), whose autograph is found on folio 15, along with the supposed date of the manuscript production: 1456. The identity of the scribe remains to be investigated. However, some of the scholars presume that at least two people have been involved in the production of Latin 7478: a rather skilled almanac-maker, able to abbreviate diagrams and tables with a minimal loss of information, and a less experienced scribe, able to adapt 19-years cycles to a required date, lacking the knowledge to perform this procedure without distorting the time of syzygies.

== Content ==
Latin 7478 follows the content pattern which is common for XV-century “bat-books” – a 76-years lunations calendar accompanied by some astronomical and astrological calculations. The basis behind Latin 7478 is Kalendarium by John of Gmunden (ca 1380/84 – 1442), an Austrian astronomer, mathematician and instrument maker. The similar content can be found in other BnF manuscripts, such as NAL 375 and NAL 482. One of the other prevalent choices for so-called “Continental almanacs” throughout the late medieval period was Peter of Dacia’s Kalendarium. In the XIV century John Somer and Nicholas of Lynn developed what is known as “English almanacs”.

== Kalendarium ==
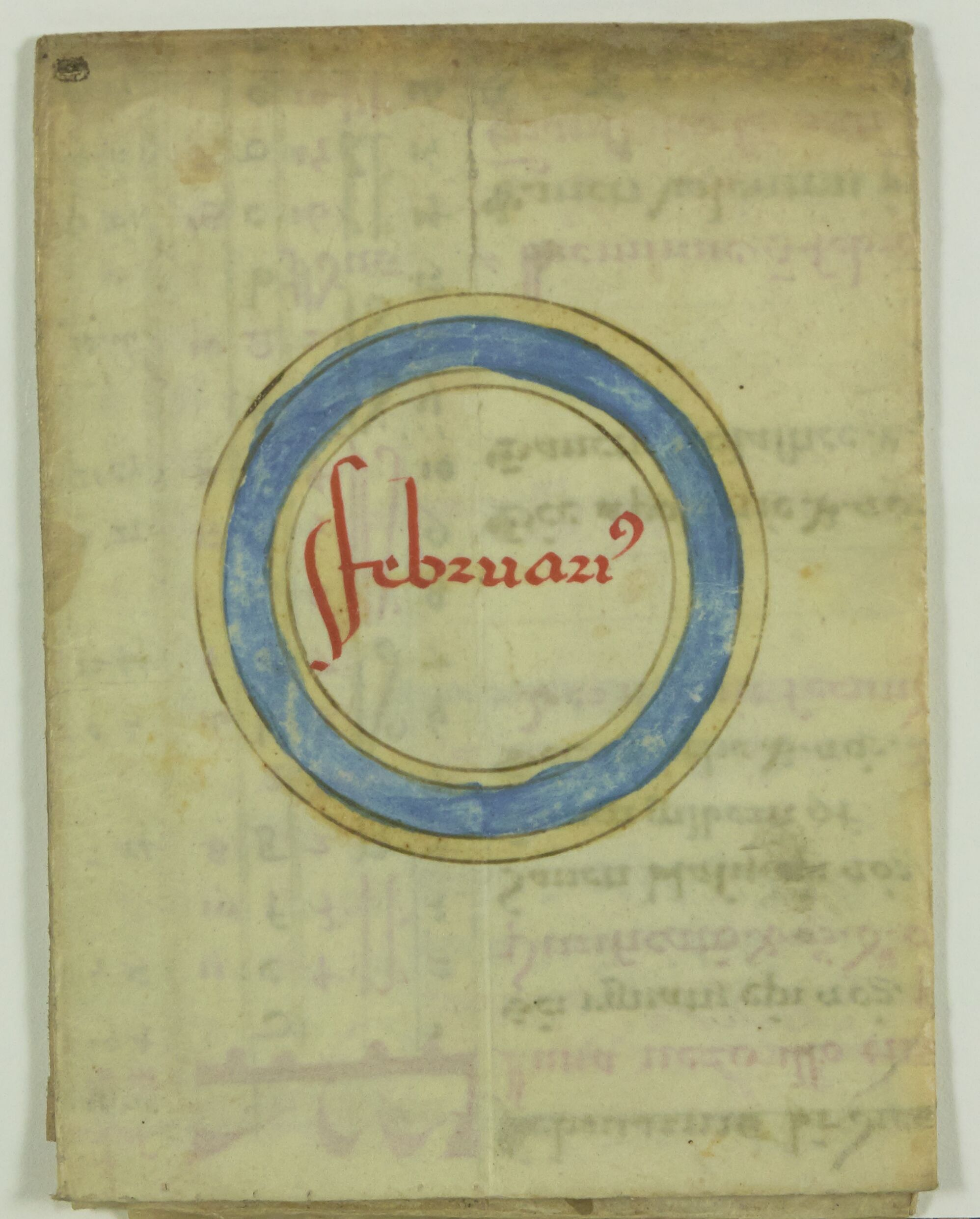
A folded folio containing the month of February

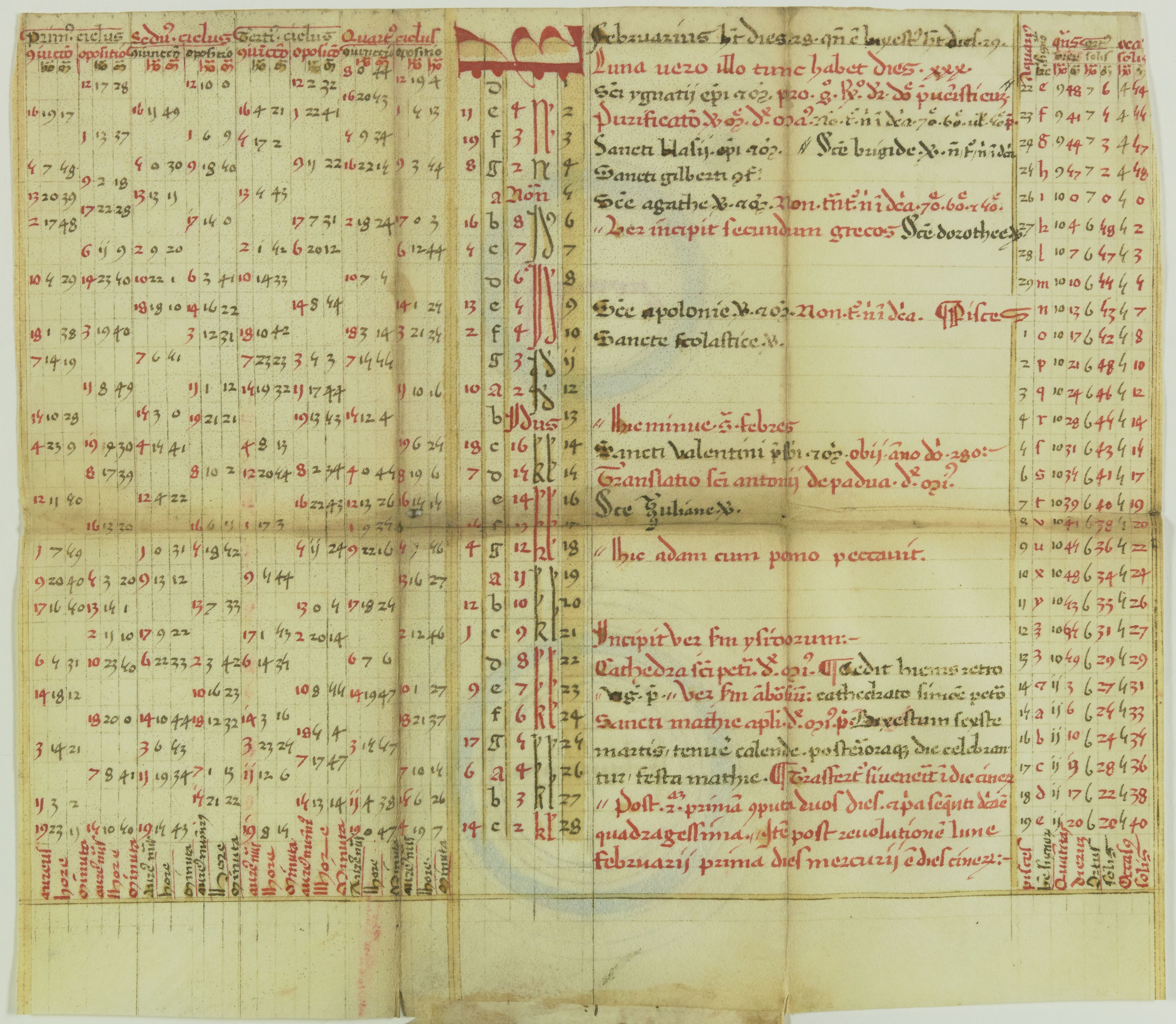
The month of February once unfolded

The first folded folio (fol. 1) of Latin 7478 contains a circular diagram dividing the years into 19-year cycles accompanied by the canon entitled “Ad sciendum per kalendarium sequens tempus conjunctionum et oppositionum solis cum lune <...>” . This diagram is intended to find out the golden number of each of the listed years (from 1456 to 1533). A canon serves as an explanation to the use of a diagram and of a calendar for finding luminaries’ mean conjunctions and oppositions in each of the above-mentioned years. If there were two scribes involved in the production of the manuscript, this part was probably copied by the less experienced one. This can be seen on folio 1r, as some of the copied numbers do not correspond exactly with the mentioned years. On folios 2–13 the Kalendarium itself is found. Each folded folio is dedicated to a month of the year and depicts dates and times of mean conjunctions and oppositions for each 19-year cycle (in relation to the year's golden number). It features the following calendric data such as the Golden Number, Sunday Letter, Roman date and number of the day, alongside some additional qualifications related to the cycle like liturgical feasts, astronomical and astrological information. Finally, an additional section focuses on topics such as the sun longitude, the lunar letter (which serves for the calculation of the moon longitude), length of the day, sunrise and sunset exact time.

Folio 14 contains a short canon and a respective equation table of the lunar zodiacal position at any time of a 19-year cycle with the use of a golden number and a lunar letter. In addition, the astrological aphorisms attributed to Regimen sanitatis Salernitanum (The flower of medecine a didactic poem in the subject of medicine) can be found at the same folded folio. This reflects the production of astro-medical compendium for traveling physicians, which follows a larger medieval tradition of using astrological knowledge to calculate the ideal time for surgical procedures or to predict the days of potential crises during the course of the illness. Such physician's almanacs were often produced in the forms of “bat-books” and sometimes contained purely medical texts and illustrations alongside the astronomical tables (an example of such almanac is the British Library manuscript Harley MS 3812)

== Liturgical calculations ==
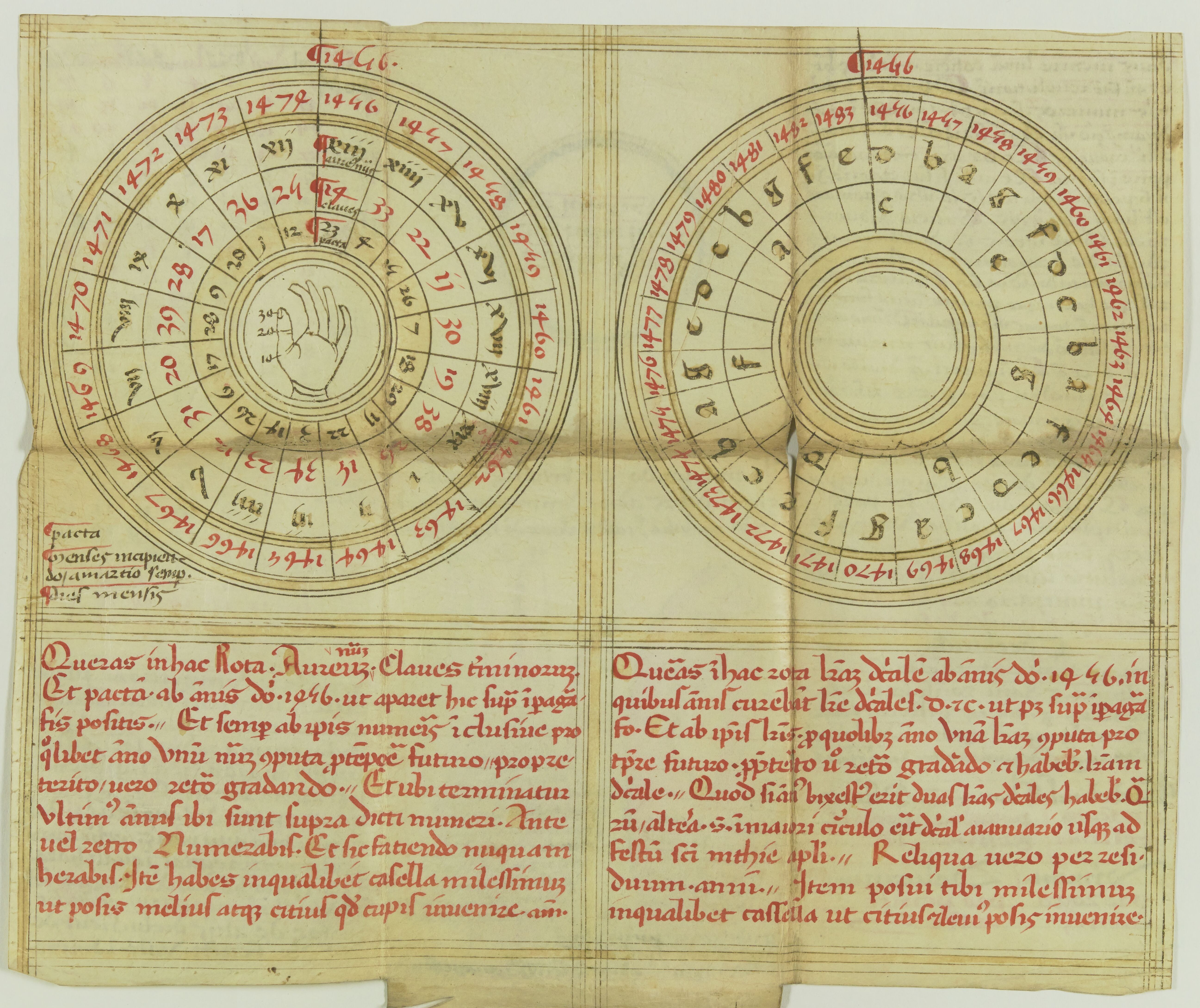
Folio 15 presenting a method for calculating Easter dates

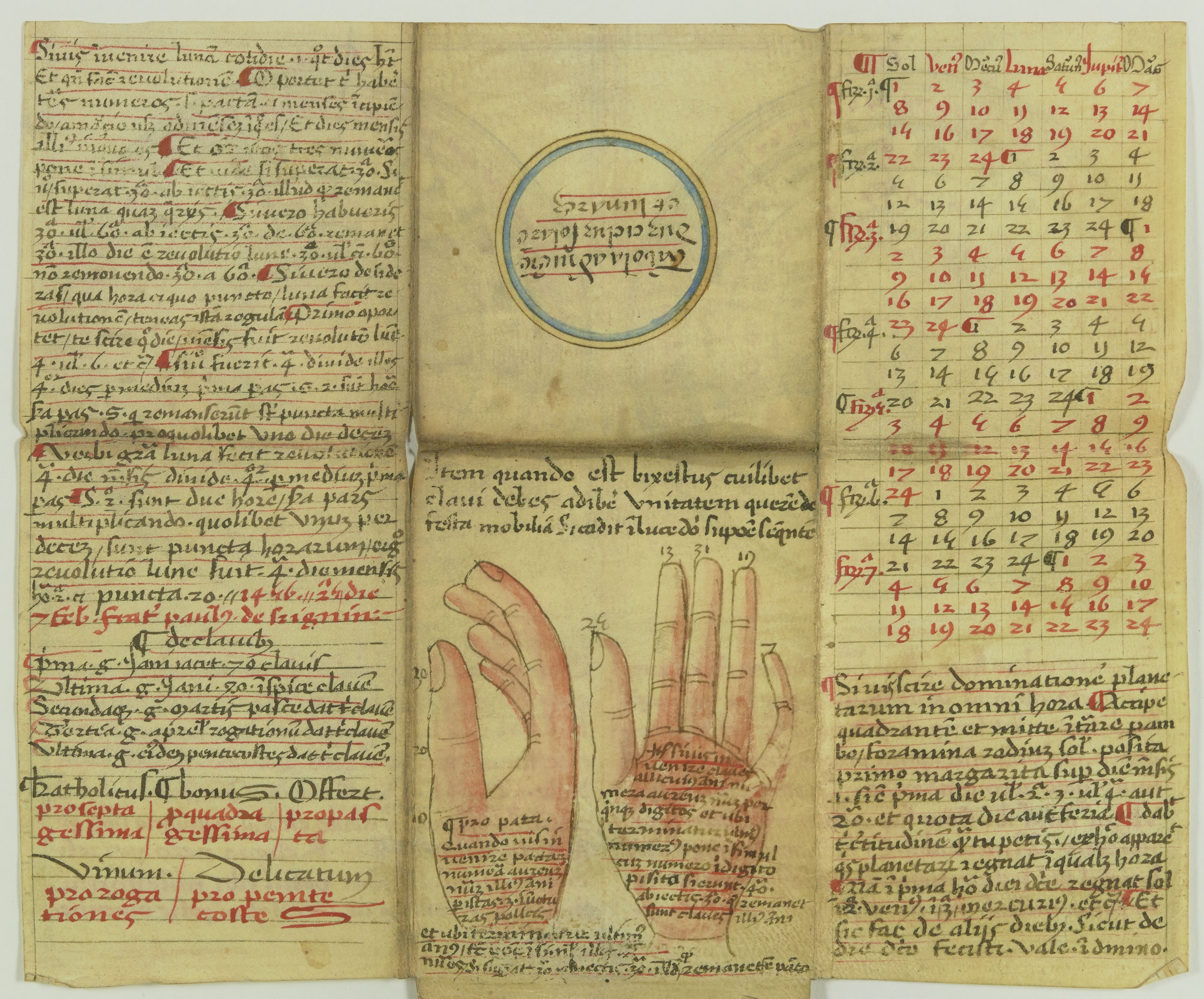
The bat book unfolded, the hand shows a practictal way to perform to calculate the date of moveable feast

This section is representative of the growing trend (starting late 13th-early 14th century) to enhance the traditional kalendarium format with the more advanced prediction methods using the astronomical tables.

== Mappa mundi ==
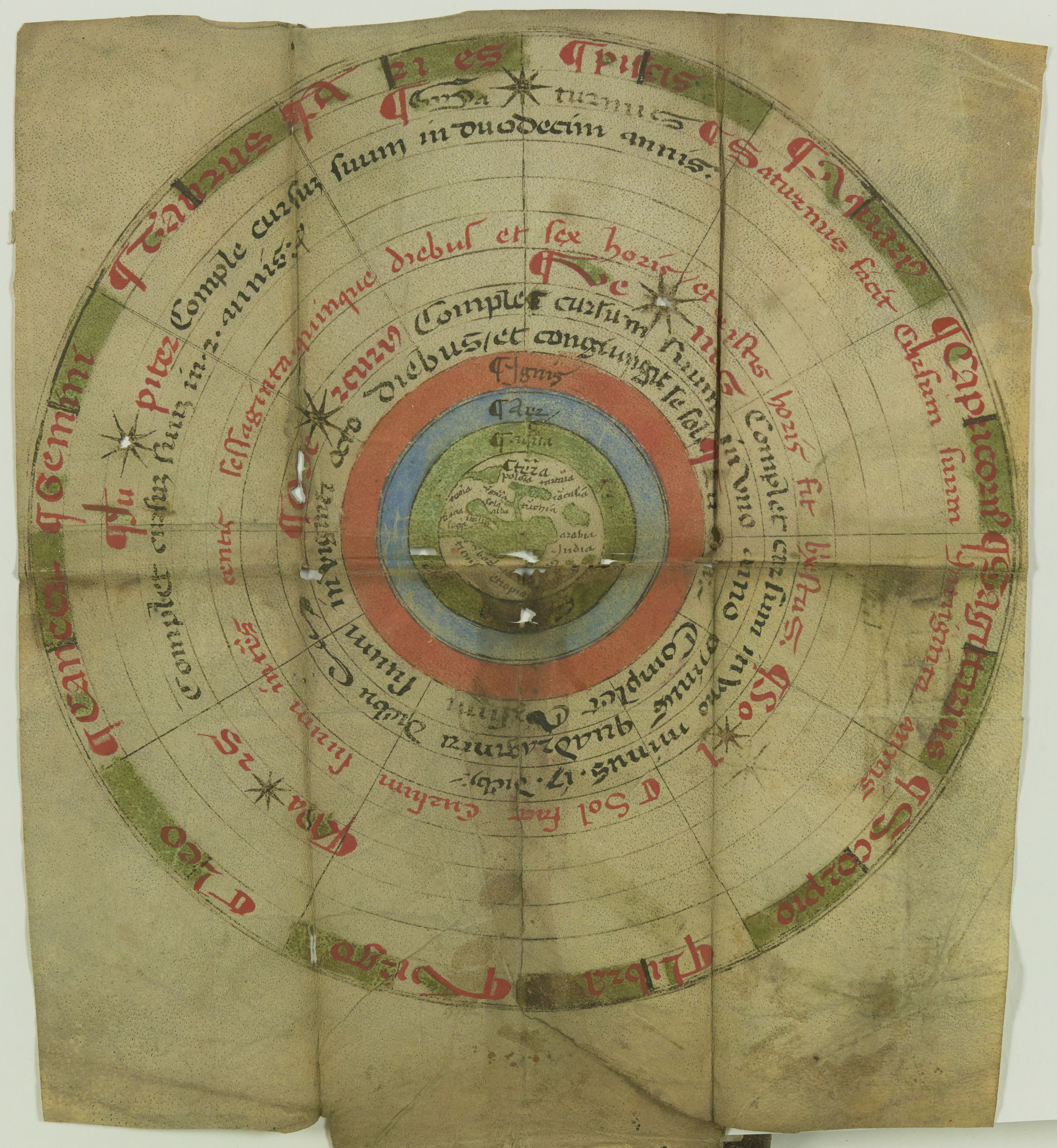
Map of the world in a cosmographical system

Folio 17 of Latin 7478 contains a diagram combining a didactic cosmographical system (represented in the form of concentric circles, one for each of the four elements) and a small geographical mappa mundi (a term used for medieval European map of the world). This mappa mundi is of particular interest to contemporary scholars due to its high level of geographical precision in comparison to other similar medieval examples. The map in Latin 7478 shows a rather realistic depiction of the Mediterranean and North sees, (The following region are labeled: “Francia” (France), “Spania” (Spain), “Italia” (Italy), “Turchia” (Turkey), “Caucasia” (Caucasus) or “Egyptus” (Egypt), and in central Europe “Polonia” (Poland), “Ungaria” (Hungary), “Scla[via]” (region inhabited by the Slavs), “Alba” (Albania).

== Table of contents ==
The manuscript's table of contents is as follows:

1. F. 1. Tabula quattuor cyclorum decemnovenalium. (Circular repartitions diagram of years by a cycle of nineteen years)
2. F. 2–13. [Kalendarium]: « Januarius » (f. 2) — « December » (f. 13).
3. F. 14. Tabula signorum lune per totum annum. (Equivalence table between the lunar letter and the lunar longitude)
4. F. 15. Tabula ad inveniendum ciclum solarem et lunarem. (Table to determine lunar and solar cycle)
5. F. 16. Tabula ad inveniendum festa mobilia et ebdomadas. (table to determine liturgical feast and weeks)
6. F. 17. A D-type mappa mundi, representing the celestial spheres and the duration of planetary orbital periods.
