= 7478 =

7478 may refer to:

- Boeing 747-8, an aircraft
- Latin 7478, 15th century astronomical manuscript
- RFC 7478, concerning real-time communication of web browsers and apps
- 7478 Hasse, a minor planet
