= John Westwyk =

14th-century astronomer-monk

- Born: c.1350 Gorham-Westwick, Hertfordshire, England
- Died: c.1400 St Albans?
- Occupation(s): Monk, astronomer, instrument-maker, mathematician, crusader

John Westwyk (/wɛstwɪk/; also known as John of Westwick; Latin: Johannes de Westwyke; c.1350-c.1400) was an English astronomer, adventurer, Benedictine monk, and author of the Equatorie of the Planetis.

== Biography ==
Little is known of John Westwyk's early life. The name Westwyk is almost certainly a toponym; he presumably came from the hamlet of Gorham-Westwick, two miles west of St Albans. He was a monk of St Albans Abbey by 1380, and was most likely ordained between 1368 and 1379. Like many monks, he was probably the son of a mid-ranking peasant or yeoman.

Westwyk probably received a basic education in the almonry school associated with the Abbey. Like around ten per cent of the St Albans monks, he may have attended the University of Oxford. He certainly studied astronomy within St Albans Abbey, and wrote out or annotated at least two astronomy books while there. Both books contained works by former abbot Richard of Wallingford (r. 1327–36), testament to Wallingford's longstanding influence on the intellectual life of the abbey.

Between 1380 and 1383 Westwyk was a monk at Tynemouth Priory in Northumbria. Tynemouth was a dependent cell of St Albans Abbey, and monks were often sent there from the mother house either as punishment or to prove themselves. While at Tynemouth, Westwyk continued his studies, annotating at least two manuscripts. In 1383 Westwyk joined the Despenser's Crusade, which captured Gravelines and unsuccessfully besieged Ypres. According to the St Albans chronicler Thomas Walsingham, Westwyk returned safely from the failed crusade.

Nothing is known of Westwyk in the years 1383–93. However, in 1393 he drafted a set of tables and produced an instruction manual for a planetary equatorium, now known as the Equatorie of the Planetis. His tables show he was working in London, probably at the Abbot of St Albans's inn on Broad Street. His equatorium drew on earlier designs such as that by Jean de Lignières, and is somewhat similar to an equatorium that survives in the library of Merton College, Oxford, but was easier to make and more user-friendly than earlier models. He evidently built it himself, albeit not at full scale. His instructions were written out in the Middle English pioneered for astronomy by Geoffrey Chaucer's Treatise on the Astrolabe, and he cites Chaucer by name. In the accompanying tables, he demonstrated painstaking copying and a flair for precise calculation.

Later in life, Westwyk probably returned to St Albans Abbey. He is named as a monk of St Albans on a papal indult dated May 1397, and this may have been an end-of-life one. There is no record of him after this, and it seems likely that he died soon afterwards.

== Modern study ==
Westwyk's Equatorie manuscript was in the library of Peterhouse, Cambridge by 1538, and probably by 1472. It was discovered there by the historian Derek de Solla Price in December 1951, making headlines worldwide. Price believed the manuscript was authored by, and written in the hand of, Geoffrey Chaucer. This was a controversial claim, and was treated with some scepticism by Chaucer scholars, though it received influential backing from the historian of astronomy John D. North. The manuscript was shown to be in the hand of John Westwyk by Kari Anne Rand in 2014. In 2020 Westwyk was the subject of a full biography by Seb Falk, which revealed new evidence for his life and work.

== Sources ==
- Falk, Seb (2020). The Light Ages: A Medieval Journey of Discovery. London: Penguin. ISBN 978-0241374252.
- North, J.D. (1988). Chaucer's Universe. Oxford: Clarendon Press. ISBN 0-19-812668-9.
- Price, Derek J. (1955). The Equatorie of the Planetis. Cambridge University Press. p. 3. ISBN 9781107404274.
- Rand, Kari Anne (2015). "The Authorship of The Equatorie of the Planetis Revisited". Studia Neophilologica. 87 (1): 15–35. doi:10.1080/00393274.2014.982355. S2CID 161392650.
- Rand Schmidt, Kari Anne (1993). The Authorship of the Equatorie of the Planetis. D.S. Brewer. ISBN 0-85991-370-8.
