= John Somer (astronomer) =

English Franciscan friar and astronomer

John Somer, also known as John Semur or John Somerarius, (fl. 1380) was an English Franciscan friar and astronomer.

Somer belonged to the Franciscan house at Bridgewater, and was probably at Oxford in 1380. At the instance of Thomas Kingsbury, provincial minister of the order, he wrote a calendar with astronomical tables—‘Tertium Opusculum Kalendarii’—for Joan, princess of Wales, mother of Richard II; it is dated 1380. Of this there are many copies—the illuminated MS. Bibl. Reg. 2 B. viii. was perhaps the presentation copy. In it the cycles run from 1387 to 1462, but in the Cotton MS. Vesp. E. vii., which contains also some planispheres, the cycle is 1405 to 1481. Another copy, among the queen of Sweden's manuscripts at the Vatican, is dated 1384, and with it is a versification of the bible (Montfaucon, Bibl. Nova MSS. i. 46, No. 1423). Among the manuscripts of Alexandre Petau (Petavius) in the Vatican, the ‘Calendar’ is dated 1372, and the versification of the bible is ascribed, with the ‘Calendar,’ to John Semur (ib. i. 66). According to Bale, he wrote also a ‘Castigation of former Calendars collected from many sources’ (Scriptt. Brit. VII. viii.).

A chronicle attributed to Somer is found in three manuscripts: Oxford, Bodleian Library, Digby 57; London, British Library, Cotton Domitian A.ii; and London, British Library, Royal 13 C 1. It consists of a table based on Bede's Easter cycle of 532 years, with the year of the Metonic cycle also indicated. The table covers the years 1001–1532 with space at the end of each entry for a historical notice. The table was able to handle events in the preceding 532-year cycles (68 BC–AD 468 and 469–1000) by marking notices with a 1, 2 or 3 depending on which of the three cycles it fell in. Linne Mooney and Jeremy Catto have published the chronicle.

John Somer's ‘Calendars’ were used by Geoffrey Chaucer, who, in his ‘Treatise on the Astrolabe,’ declares his intention of making a third part that shall contain divers tables of longitudes and latitudes, and declinations of the sun after the calendars of the reverend clerks, John Somer and Nicholas of Lynne. The third part, however, is wanting (cf. Chaucer, Works, ed. Skeat, iii. 353).
