= The Equatorie of the Planetis =

14th-century scientific work formerly attributed to Chaucer

The Equatorie of the Planetis is a 14th-century scientific work which describes the construction and use of an equatorium. It was first studied in the early 1950s by Derek J. Price, and was formerly attributed to Geoffrey Chaucer. However, in 2014 it was shown to be written in the hand of the St Albans monk John Westwyk. It is largely written in Middle English, with some additions in Latin. It is accompanied by extensive astronomical tables, with Latin headings and annotations.

== Manuscript ==
Peterhouse MS 75 was a composite manuscript. In the early 1950s, after Price discovered the Equatorie in it, the manuscript was split into two parts (and both parts rebound): MS 75.I, containing the Equatorie, and MS 75.II, containing works by Nicholas Trivet and Vegetius.

MS 75.I has two parts: fol. 1r-71r contains largely astronomical tables, and some astrological material, in two hands; 71v-78v contains the text of the Equatorie treatise. The parchment is of varying quality, with ten quires of pages measuring 365x260mm (except for the last quires). The ink is brown; there are signs of dampness on the upper edge, especially in the first quire, with some blurring in the fourth quire on the top of the pages. According to Rand Schmidt, the dampness and the wear and tear on some of the quires is evidence that the quires spent some time unbound.

The text contains references to 31 December 1392, and this is used as a baseline date for many of the tables. John North showed that the text was written during the first nine months of 1393. How it came to Peterhouse is not known, but it probably happened during the 15th century; around 1538 it is entered in Peterhouse catalog, as Tab. aequ. planetarum autore Simon Bredon. The Equatorie occupies eight leaves of the manuscript; the phrase Radix chaucer appears on fol. 5v.

The manuscript has been digitised for the Cambridge University Digital Library website, together with a virtual model of the equatorium.

=== "Radix chaucer" ===
On f. 5v, in a note on a page full of tables, the manuscript has the number "1392", followed by that number in sexagesimal notation, and the text "deffe^{a} xpi & R^{x}a chaucer". Price, and following him other scholars, expanded this as "differentia Christi et radix Chaucer"—or "the difference (in number of days) between (the year of Christ) and the (year of the) radix of Chaucer"—the radix in question then being the year 1392. F.N. Robinson was not convinced that this (third-person) reference indicated Chaucer's authorship. However, John North argued that the attachment of a name to a relatively "trivial" piece of data made it likely that this was a case of self-citation.

== Discovery and authorship ==
The manuscript was in the library of Peterhouse, Cambridge by 1538, and probably by 1472. It was discovered there by the historian Derek de Solla Price in December 1951. Although the 19th-century manuscript catalogue stated that the manuscript contained "directions for making an astrolabe (?)", Price identified the instrument as a planetary equatorium. He argued that the manuscript was authored by, and written in the hand of, Geoffrey Chaucer. This was a controversial claim, and was treated with some scepticism by Chaucer scholars, though it received influential backing from the historian of astronomy John North. The manuscript was shown to be in the hand of John Westwyk by Kari Anne Rand in 2014. Further evidence for Westwyk's authorship was revealed by Seb Falk in a book published in 2020.

=== Debate ===
Price published an abstract in 1953, and the whole text (facsimile, transcription, and studies of the manuscript) in 1955. He maintained the possibility that Chaucer authored the Equatorie, possibly as the missing part of his A Treatise on the Astrolabe, which describes the astrolabe; the Equatorie makes direct reference to it. He argued that the manuscript was a holograph draft, written in the hand of its author, as shown by the many additions and corrections in the manuscript.

Price offered five points as indicators of Chaucer's authorship:

1. Style and scientific treatment of the material are similar to A Treatise on the Astrolabe;
2. The text mentions that the year 1392 is the "Radix" (or "root") of Chaucer;
3. The main hand (including that of the "Radix" note) resembled, Price thought, a document likely written in Chaucer's hand;
4. Linguistic similarities between the Equatorie and Chaucer's work, including "verbal echoes of the Astrolabe;
5. The author is influenced by Merton's school of astronomy but lives in London, and the writing is that of an amateur, not a professional astronomer; in addition, the writer is familiar with "the diplomatic cipher methods of his time"—all elements that correspond with Chaucer's biography.

Following the publication of the facsimile and transcription, G. Herdan published an article in which he concluded, based upon the percentage of words in the Equatorie of "Romance vocabulary" (which includes words from Old French, Anglo-Norman French, and Latin), that Chaucer was indeed the author: "The agreement between observation and expectation, or between fact and theory, is so striking that without going further into the question of statistical significance we may conclude that by the token of Romance vocabulary the Equatorie is to be regarded as a work by Chaucer".

However, Price's arguments were challenged in various ways. His claim that the manuscript was a draft in the hand of its author was disputed, though ultimately the evidence does seem to support it. More significantly, Price's claim that the handwriting was that of Geoffrey Chaucer was disproved by analysis by Kari Anne Rand Schmidt.

In 2014 Kari Anne Rand identified the hand as belonging to John Westwyk.

== Content ==
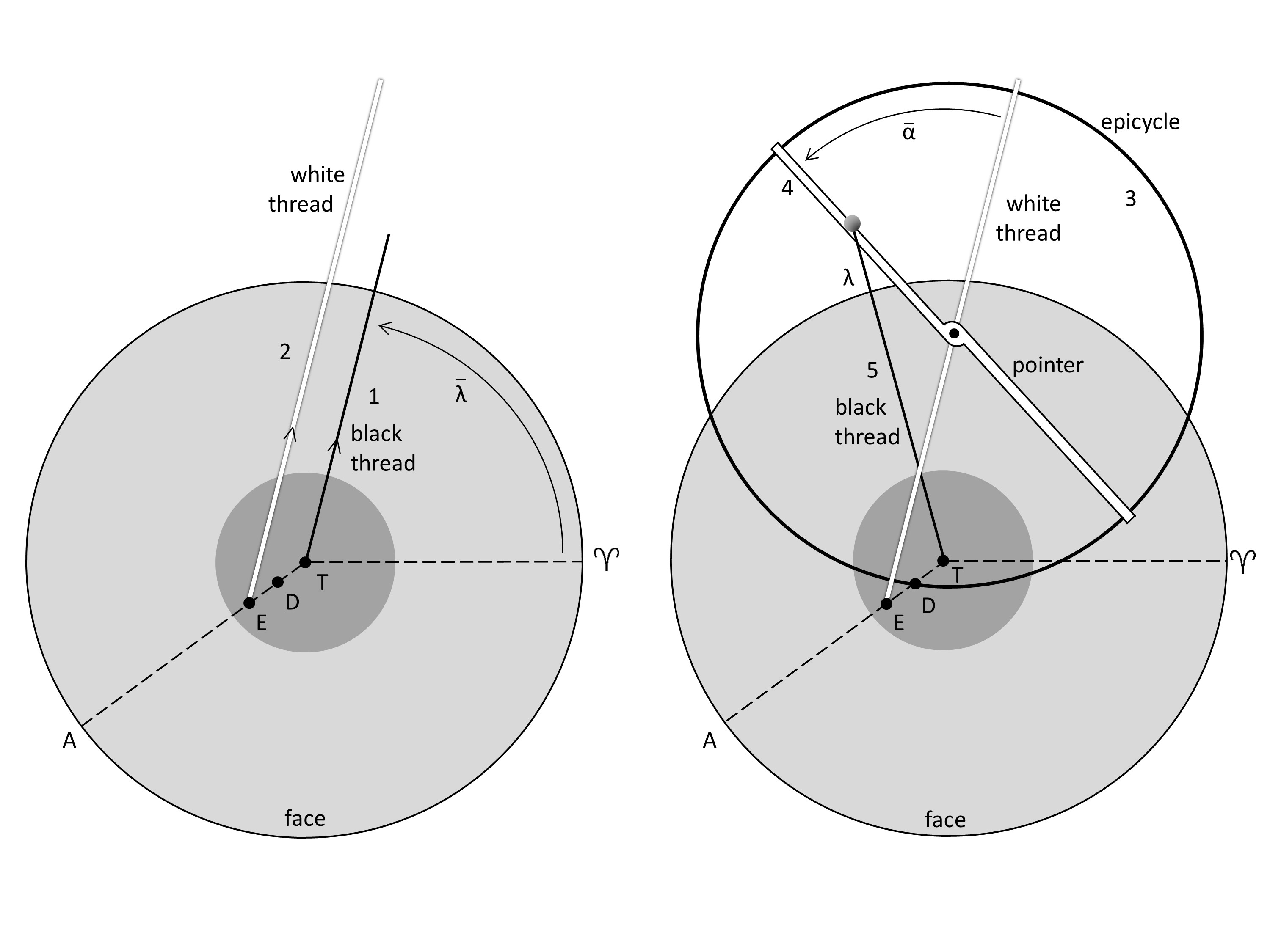
Steps in the use of the Equatorie to find the position of a superior planet

The text describes the construction of an equatorium, an instrument comparable to the astrolabe – but where an astrolabe shows the positions of the stars, an equatorium computes them for the planets, according to the Geocentric model of Ptolemy. The instrument is constructed from two discs, six feet in diameter. One of them is solid, and is marked with characteristics of the orbits of the various planets: their apogee, their equants, and other centres. The other disc consists of "a ring, a diametral bar, and a rule pivoted at the centre of the bar". The two discs are joined and simulate the motions of each of the planets. A divided circle around the rims of the two discs allow for the transferral of information from sets of tables (the Alfonsine tables, from a Parisian document) that contain the data for each planet.

The design was based on earlier equatoria, but refined for greater ease of manufacture and use. It permits the user to find the longitudes of any classical planet (including the Sun and Moon, as well as the lunar latitude).

=== Cipher ===
A cipher is used for some comments on the tables, and Price gave the key. He could not, however, discern what the rationale of or the ordering behind the key was – whether it was perhaps based on some medieval version of the Greek alphabet, or whether there was "some key-phrase or sentence such as a name or family motto" behind it.
