= Johannes von Gmunden =

German astronomer, mathematician and humanist

- Born: 1380/84; Gmunden, Duchy of Austria, Holy Roman Empire
- Died: February 23, 1442; Vienna, Duchy of Austria, Holy Roman Empire
- Education: University of Vienna (M.A., 1406)
- Known for: Astronomical tables
- Scientific career
- Fields: Astronomy
- Workplaces: University of Vienna
- Academic advisors: Heinrich von Langenstein
- Notable students: Georg von Peuerbach

Johannes von Gmünd is also the name of a 14th-century architect, see Basel Münster.

Johannes von Gmunden (Latin: Johannes de Gamundia; c. 1380/84 – February 23, 1442) was a German astronomer, mathematician and humanist.

== Biography ==
Johannes von Gmunden received the degree of a Master of Arts at the University of Vienna in 1406. From 1408, he was a lecturer at Vienna, lecturing on Aristotle's Physics (1408) and Meteora (1409, 1411), Peter of Spain (1410) and Algorismus de minutiis (1412). He fell seriously ill in 1412.

In 1415 and 1416 studied theology, completing a Bachelor of Theology in 1416. He continued lecturing only in 1419, on algorismus de integris. From 1420, Johannes was permitted to restrict his teaching to the specialized field of the mathematics of astronomy, focusing on Euclid's Elements and the Sphaera materialis of John Holywood. With the aid of students (Weidler's 1741 Historia astronomiae names Georg Pruneck of Ruspach, Georg of Neuenburg, Johannes Schinkel and Johannes Feldner) he compiled voluminous astronomical tables. In 1425, he was elected canon at St. Stephen's Cathedral. Georg von Peuerbach succeeded him at Vienna University in 1450.

John's origins are somewhat disputed. He was probably born in Gmunden, Upper Austria, but there were also suggestions connecting him with Gmünd, Lower Austria, or that he was a Swabian from Schwäbisch Gmünd who studied in Ulm in his youth, based on a document written at Ulm in 1404 by one "Johannes Wissbier de Gamundia".

== Legacy ==
- Asteroid 15955 Johannesgmunden is named after him.

== Works ==
- Astrolabii qui primi mobilis motus deprehendur canones (1515)

== See also ==
- List of Roman Catholic scientist-clerics
- BnF Latin 7478
