= Mark de Solla Price =

American author and HIV/AIDS educator

- Born: May 17, 1960 (age 66); New Haven, Connecticut, U.S.
- Father: Derek J. de Solla Price

Mark de Solla Price (born May 17, 1960, in New Haven, Connecticut) is an American author, journalist, public speaker, civil rights activist, and HIV/AIDS educator. Price authored the 1995 book Living Positively in a World with HIV/AIDS and was a featured subject (along with his late husband Vinny Allegrini) in the 2006 HBO documentary Positively Naked with Spencer Tunick.

== Career and activism ==
De Solla Price was formerly Director of Information Technology for CDM Publishing, LLC (Smart + Strong : POZ Real Health AIDSmeds ComboCards).

De Solla Price was a marriage equality advocate prior to the nationwide legalization of same-sex marriage in 2015.

He is a blogger at POZ magazine. In late 2006, he went on disability leave from POZ.

== Personal life ==
He is the son of the historian of science Derek J. de Solla Price. He is of Spanish-Jewish and English-Jewish descent on his father's side, and his mother is Danish. He is a Unitarian Universalist.

De Solla Price tested positive for HIV in 1983. He began dating Vinny Allegrini in the early 1990s, and as of 2006 the couple lived in Greenwich Village. In 2006, de Solla Price was also diagnosed with hepatitis C. De Solla Price's husband, Vinny Allegrini, died at 66 on March 4, 2015, from an AIDS-related cirrhosis.

== Bibliography ==
- Living Positively in a World with HIV/AIDS - Avon Books ISBN 0-380-77623-5, ISBN 0-380-77623-5 (1995)
