= Inventio Fortunata =

Lost book from the 14th century, describing the North Pole as an island

Inventio Fortunata (also Inventio Fortunate, Inventio Fortunat or Inventio Fortunatae), "Fortunate, or fortune-making, discovery", is a lost book, probably dating from the 14th century, containing a description of the North Pole as a magnetic island (the Rupes Nigra) surrounded by a giant whirlpool and four continents. No direct extracts from the document have been discovered, but its influence on the Western idea of the geography of the Arctic region persisted for several centuries.

== The story of the Inventio ==
The book is said to be a travelogue written by a 14th-century Franciscan (Minorite) friar from Oxford who travelled the North Atlantic region in the early 1360s, making some half-a-dozen journeys conducting business on behalf of the King of England (Edward III). He described what he found on his first journey to the islands beyond 54 degrees north in a book, Inventio Fortunata, which he presented to the King.

By the time Atlantic explorers were seeking information in the 1490s, the Inventio had gone missing, and was only known through a summary in a second text, the Itinerarium, written by a Brabantian traveller from 's-Hertogenbosch named Jacobus Cnoyen (also known as James Cnoyen or Jakob van Knoyen; modern Knox). As will be discussed below, Cnoyen's summary was the basis for the depiction of the Arctic region on many maps, one of the earliest being Martin Behaim's 1492 globe. By the late 16th century, even Cnoyen's text was missing, so most of what we know of the contents of the Inventio Fortunata, other than its use on maps, is found in a letter from the Flemish cartographer Gerardus Mercator to the English astronomer John Dee dated April 20, 1577, now located in the British Library.

Cnoyen's information came in a very round-about way. In 1364, a priest from one of the Atlantic islands had returned to Norway, bringing with him an astrolabe which he had received from the visiting Franciscan friar, in exchange for a religious book. He made a detailed report to the King of Norway. Copies still survive of a social and geographical description of Greenland by a local church official named Ivar Bardarson, who turns up in Norwegian records in 1364, so this much of Cnoyen's story tallies well with reality (although this report does not contain the sort of personal information relayed by Cnoyen). Cnoyen seems to have obtained his information from Norwegian sources some time later, neither he nor the priest having actually seen the Inventio.

Cnoyen's account (originally in his own language; translations here based on Eva Taylor's version) mixes probable fact with what may have been his own attempts to research the background, stating that Greenland was first settled at the orders of King Arthur, whose army supposedly conquered the North Atlantic islands. He also refers to the "indrawing seas"- currents which drew ships northward, so that:

"nearly 4000 persons entered the indrawing seas who never returned. But in A.D. 1364 eight of these people came to the King's Court in Norway. Among them were two priests, one of whom had an astrolabe, who was descended in the 5th generation from a Brussels citizen. One, I say: all eight were from those who had penetrated the northern regions in the first ships."

Of the visiting Franciscan, Cnoyen (or Mercator) summarised the priest's report thus:

"Leaving the rest of the party who had come to the Islands, he journeyed further, through the whole of the North etc, and put into writing all the wonders of those Islands, and gave the King of England this book, which he called in Latin Inventio Fortunatae."

In reality, the "book" may have been a detailed report, intended mainly to highlight the commercial possibilities offered by the North Atlantic following the decline of Norwegian interest in its colonies.

== Authorship ==
The English historian of exploration Richard Hakluyt, identifies the author of the Inventio as Nicholas of Lynn. The identification of Nicholas as the Franciscan (Minorite) friar who wrote the text, which allegedly describes a voyage to Greenland and beyond, was first proposed by Hakluyt in the late 16th-century. Hakluyt based the claim on information from mathematician John Dee who, in turn, relied on information obtained from the Flemish cartographer Gerardus Mercator.

As Nicholas was born around the year 1360 and the friar who supposedly explored and mapped the area in question did so in 1364, when Nicholas was a toddler, it is highly unlikely that he wrote the Inventio Fortunata. Nicholas was also a Carmelite friar, not a Franciscan, and according to early 16th-century literary historian John Bale, an Irishman named Hugh, who was a Franciscan, travelled widely in the 14th century, and wrote "a certain journey in one volume" – but again, whether or not this was the Inventio, no copy of it is known.

== Influence on maps ==
The concept of the pole as a magnetic mountain goes back at least to Roman times, but the author of Inventio Fortunata added other features to the picture as well as measurements. Whether or not the Inventio is the source of the medieval concept of the North Pole as a magnetic mountain surrounded by a circular continent divided by four powerful rivers, maps as early as Martin Behaim's 1492 globe depict the region in this way.

Johannes Ruysch's Universalior cogniti orbis tabula from 1508, features a marginal note mentioning the Inventio Fortunata:

It is said in the book concerning the fortunate discovery [Inventio Fortunate] that at the arctic pole there is a high magnetic rock, thirty-three German miles in circumference. A surging sea surrounds this rock, as if the water were discharged downward from a vase through an opening. Around it are islands, two of which are inhabited.

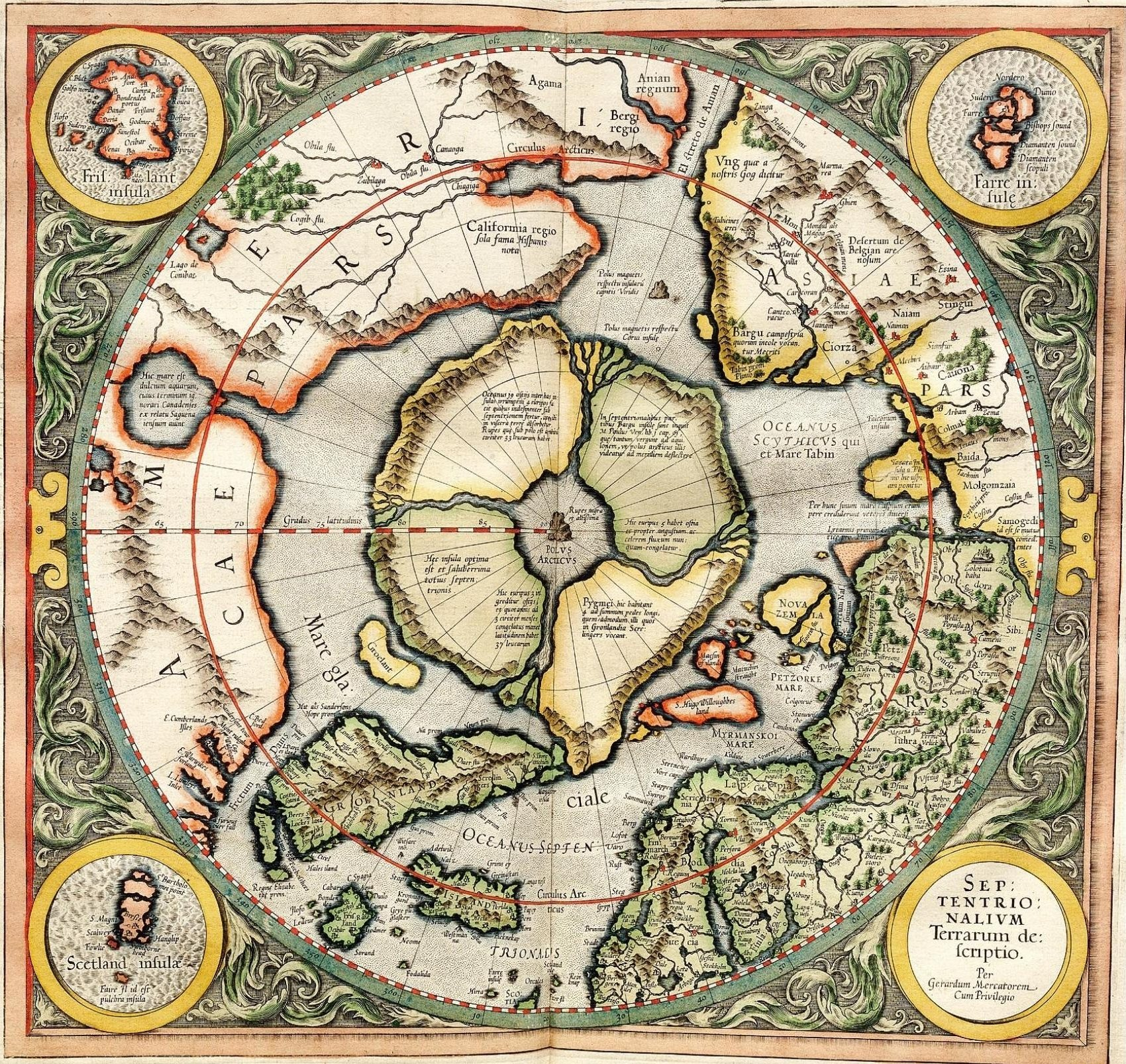
Mercator's map from 1595 showing the mythical Arctic continent, with the "Rupes nigra et altissima" ('black and highest rock') at its centre. The Rock is the site of the North Pole, captioned as the POLVS ARCTICVS.

Gerardus Mercator's world map of 1569 reflects his reading of Cnoyen's Itinerarium. It also features a marginal note alluding to the Franciscan's "discovery", but not to the book itself, which he never saw:

we have taken [the Arctic geography] from the Itinerium of Jacobus Cnoyen of the Hague, who makes some citations from the Gesta of Arthur of Britain; however, the greater and most important part he learned from a certain priest at the court of the king of Norway in 1364. He was descended in the fifth generation from those whom Arthur had sent to inhabit these lands, and he related that in the year 1360 a certain Minorite, an Englishman from Oxford, a mathematician, went to those islands; and leaving them, advanced still farther by magic arts and mapped out all and measured them by an astrolabe in practically the subjoined figure, as we have learned from Jacobus. The four canals there pictured he said flow with such current to the inner whirlpool, that if vessels once enter they cannot be driven back by wind.

The Arctic map inset on Mercator's 1569 world map was the prototype for the influential and widely circulated Septentrionalium Terrarum of 1595, posthumously published by his son, and the maps in Ortelius's Theatrum Orbis Terrarum of 1570. Both show the same configuration of the arctic regions as the 1569 map. In his letter to Dee, Mercator further quotes Cnoyen's description of the Northern regions:

...In the midst of the four countries is a Whirlpool into which there empty these four Indrawing Seas which divide the North. And the water rushes round and descends into the earth just as if one were pouring it through a filter funnel. It is 4 degrees wide on every side of the Pole, that is to say eight degrees altogether. Except that right under the Pole there lies a bare rock in the midst of the Sea. Its circumference is almost 33 French miles, and it is all of magnetic stone. And is as high as the clouds, so the Priest said, who had received the astrolabe from this Minorite in exchange for a Testament. And the Minorite himself had heard that one can see all round it from the Sea, and that it is black and glistening. And nothing grows thereon, for there is not so much as a handful of soil on it.

The persistence of this idea of the geography of the far north persisted throughout the 16th and 17th century. This is probably due to the influence of Ruysch, Mercator, and Ortelius. Maps were only revised when the region was explored and mapmakers obtained knowledge of the true geography of the Arctic.

More interesting to modern researchers are the people the friar encountered, "pygmies" who may well be identical with the Skrælings referred to in old Norse texts about Greenland, predecessors of the modern Inuit.

== The John Day letter ==
In 1956 a letter referring to the existence of the book was found in the Archivo General de Simancas (Spain) from the English merchant John Day to "The Most Magnificent And Most Worthy Lord - The Lord Grand Admiral" (presumably Christopher Columbus).

In the letter, written in either December 1497 or January 1498, John Day says,

...Your Lordship's servant brought me your letter. I have seen its contents and I would be most desirous and most happy to serve you. I do not find the book Inventio Fortunata, and I thought that I (or he) was bringing it with my things, and I am very sorry not [to] find it because I wanted very much to serve you. I am sending the other book of Marco Polo and a copy of the land which has been found [by John Cabot]...
