= Rupes Nigra =

Apocryphal island near the North Pole

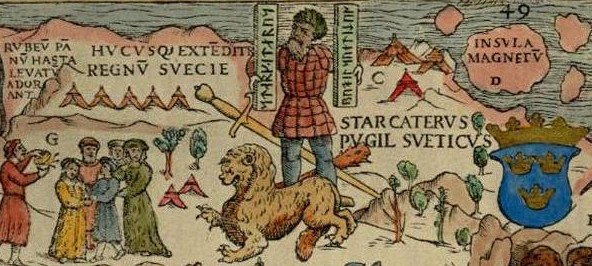
Part of the Carta marina of 1539 by Olaus Magnus, depicting the location of magnetic north vaguely conceived as "Insula Magnetu[m]" (Latin for "Island of Magnets") off modern-day Murmansk.

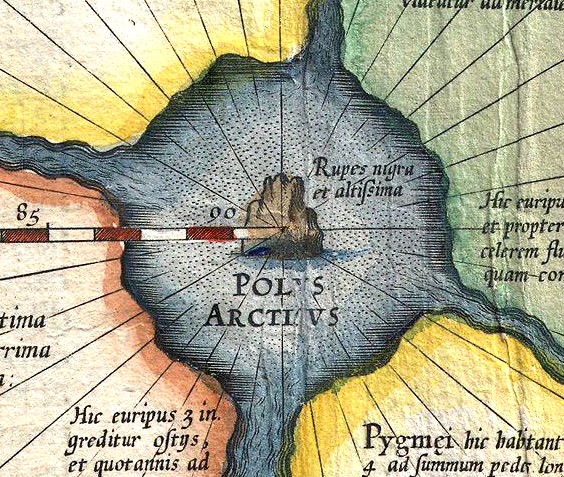
Detail from Gerardus Mercator's map of the Arctic (c. 1620 edition), showing the Rupes Nigra at the North Pole ('POLVS ARCTICVS'), surrounded by four large islands.

The Rupes Nigra ("Black Cliff"), a phantom island, was believed to be a black rock located at the North Magnetic Pole or at the geographic North Pole itself. Described by Gerardus Mercator as 33 French miles in size, it provided a supposed explanation for why all compasses point to this location. The idea came from a lost work titled Inventio Fortunata, and the island featured on maps from the sixteenth and seventeenth centuries, including those of Mercator and his successors. Mercator described the island in a 1577 letter to John Dee:

In the midst of the four countries is a Whirl-pool, into which there empty these four indrawing Seas which divide the North. And the water rushes round and descends into the Earth just as if one were pouring it through a filter funnel. It is four degrees wide on every side of the Pole, that is to say eight degrees altogether. Except that right under the Pole there lies a bare Rock in the midst of the Sea. Its circumference is almost 33 French miles, and it is all of magnetic Stone (...) This is word for word everything that I copied out of this author [Jacobus Cnoyen] years ago.
