= Equatorium =

Astronomical calculating instrument

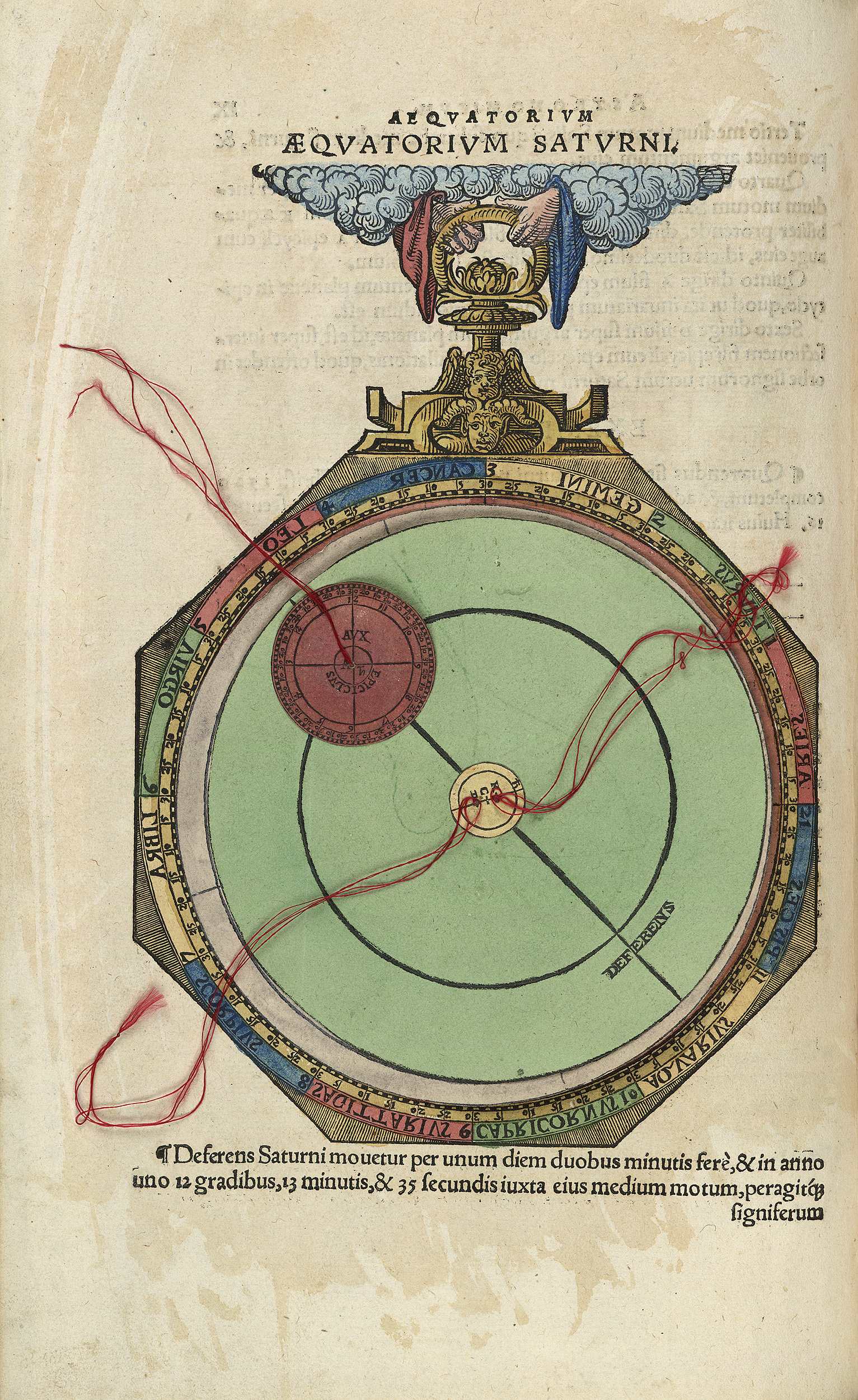
Equatorium from Johannes Schöner

An equatorium (plural, equatoria) is an astronomical calculating instrument. It can be used for finding the positions of the Moon, Sun, and planets without arithmetic operations, using a geometrical model to represent the position of a given celestial body.

== History ==
In his comment on Ptolemy's Handy Tables, 4th-century mathematician Theon of Alexandria introduced some diagrams to geometrically compute the position of the planets based on Ptolemy's epicyclical theory. The first description of the construction of a solar equatorium (as opposed to planetary) is contained in Proclus's fifth-century work Hypotyposis, where he gives instructions on how to construct one in wood or bronze.

The earliest known descriptions of planetary equatoria are in the Latin translation of an early eleventh-century text by Ibn al‐Samḥ and a 1080/1081 treatise by al-Zarqālī, contained in the Libros del saber de astronomia (Books of the knowledge of astronomy), a Castilian compilation of astronomical works collected under the patronage of Alfonso X of Castile in the thirteenth century.

The Theorica Planetarum (c. 1261–1264) by Campanus of Novara is the earliest extant description of the construction of an equatorium in Latin Europe. Campanus' instrument resembled an astrolabe, with several interchangeable plates within a mater. The best manuscripts of Campanus' treatise contain paper and parchment equatoria with moveable parts.

Early in 1393, the English Benedictine monk John Westwyk completed his Equatorie de Planetis, a manuscript containing original designs for a large equatorium, along with directions for its construction and a long series of astronomical tables calibrated for use with the device. If built according to his instructions, Westwyk's equatorium would have measured 6 feet in diameter, allowing astronomers a much greater degree of precision in their calculations, but a full-scale model made to Westwyk's ideal specifications would have been prohibitively expensive during his lifetime, making it unlikely that his ideal iteration of the device was ever constructed.

== Variations ==
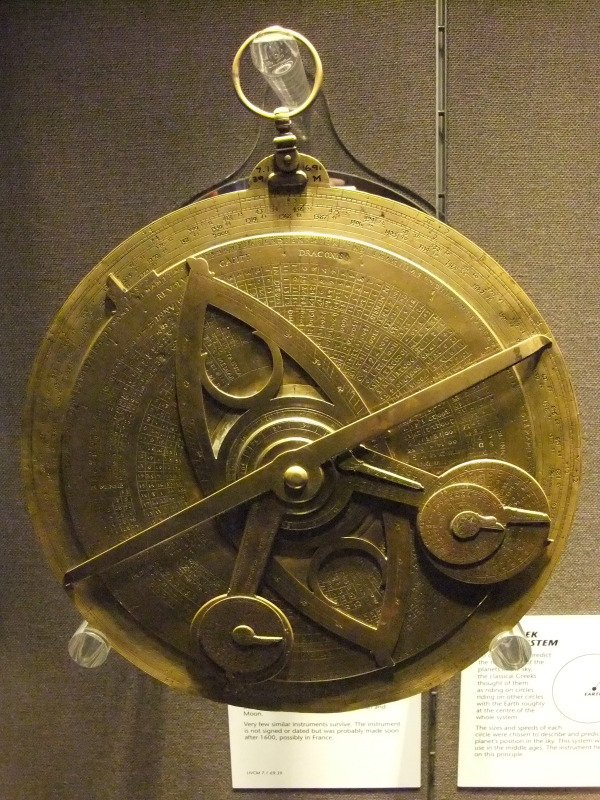
A 1600 equatorium, possibly from France

The history of the equatorium does not just end after the 11th century, but it inspired a more diverse invention called “The Albion”. The Albion is an astronomical instrument invented by Richard of Wallingford at the beginning of the 14th century. It has various functional uses such as that of the equatorium for planetary and conjunction computations. It can calculate when eclipses will occur. The Albion is made up of 18 different scales which makes it extremely complex in comparison to the equatorium. The history of this instrument is still disputed to this day, as the only Albion from the past is both unnamed and unmarked.

== Astrolabe compared with equatorium ==
The roots of the equatorium lie in the astrolabe. The history of the astrolabe dates back to roughly 220 BC in the works of Hipparchus. The difference between the two instruments is that the astrolabe measures the time and position of the sun and stars at a specific location in time. In contrast, the equatorium is used to calculate the past or future positions of the planets and celestial bodies according to the planetary theory of Ptolemy.

== Uses ==
The equatorium can further be specialized depending on the epicycle. There are three possible epicycles that can be adjusted to serve for planetary positions in three groups: the Moon, the stars, and the Sun. The Sun was considered a planet in the Ptolemaic system, hence why the equatorium could be used to determine its position. Through the use of Ptolemy's model, astronomers were able to make a single instrument with various capabilities that catered to the belief that the Solar System had the Earth at the center. In fact, specialized equatoria had astrological aspects of medicine, as the orientation of planets gave insight to zodiac signs which helped some doctors cater medical treatments to patients.

At least 15 minutes was needed to calculate the planetary position with the use of a table for each celestial body. A horoscope of that era would have required the positions of seven astronomical objects, requiring nearly two hours of manual calculation time.

== See also ==
- Antikythera mechanism
- Armillary sphere
- Astrarium
- Astrolabe
- Astronomical clock
- Orrery
- Planetarium
- The Equatorie of the Planetis
- Torquetum
