= Nicholas of Lynn =

English astronomer

Nicholas of Lynn or Lynne, also known in Latin as Nicolas de Linna, was an English astronomer of the 14th century.

== Life ==
Nicholas was born in the port of Bishop's Lynn (now called King's Lynn) in the English county of Norfolk. He was possibly born in 1330, although the confirmed details of his career suggest that a date closer to 1360 is more likely. According to the early 16th-century literary historian John Bale, Nicholas became a Carmelite friar and moved to the university town of Oxford, where he developed a reputation for his astronomical work.

In 1386, at the request of John of Gaunt, Nicholas published a Kalendarium of detailed astronomical tables covering the years 1387–1462. It survives in 16 manuscripts and one printed edition. Designed for use in the astrologically-based science of the time, the tables were sophisticated. They included rules for synchronising medical treatment with astronomical cycles, for example in using the phases of the moon to time blood-letting.

A contemporary of Nicholas, the poet and author Geoffrey Chaucer, wrote approvingly of Nicholas' work, and made use of it. Nicholas was supposedly an excellent musician. Later in life he moved to Cambridge, where he was promoted to the post of subdeacon in 1410. He became a deacon in 1411. The date of his death is unknown.

== Reputation ==
What he was not, as far as any early biographers were concerned, was an explorer. The identification of Nicholas as the Franciscan (Minorite) friar who wrote a text called the Inventio Fortunata, allegedly describing a voyage to Greenland and beyond, was first proposed by Richard Hakluyt, the late 16th-century historian of exploration. Hakluyt based the claim on information from mathematician John Dee who, in turn, relied on information obtained from the Flemish cartographer Gerardus Mercator. Nicholas, however, was a Carmelite, not a Minorite, and if Hakluyt and Dee had read Bale (rather than apparently basing their identification on Chaucer's praise for Nicholas' work with astrolabes), they would have discovered an entry about a Franciscan friar named Hugh of Ireland, who wrote "a certain journey in one volume".
