= A Treatise on the Astrolabe =

Medieval instruction manual on the astrolabe by Geoffrey Chaucer

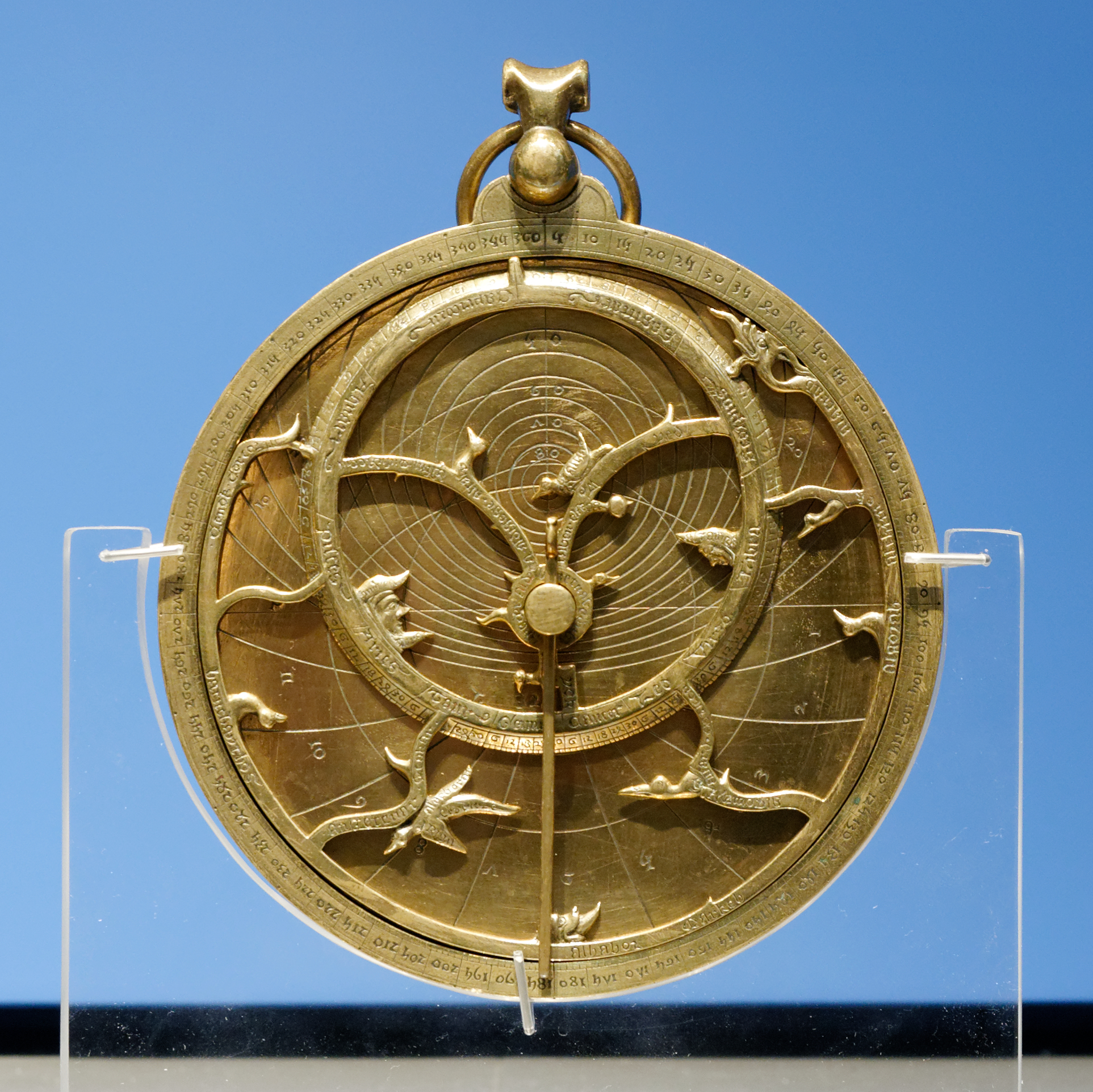
A so-called 'Chaucer Astrolabe' dated 1326, similar to the one Chaucer describes, British Museum

A Treatise on the Astrolabe is a medieval instruction manual on the astrolabe, completed by Geoffrey Chaucer in 1391. Notable as technical prose from a writer better known for poetry, it describes both the form and the proper use of the instrument. It was written in Middle English rather than the more typical Latin.

The treatise is dedicated to Chaucer's son Lowys (Lewis), who was ten during its composition.

== Significance ==
The Treatise is considered the 'oldest work in English written upon an elaborate scientific instrument'. It is admired for its clarity in explaining difficult concepts, although modern readers lacking an actual astrolabe may find these descriptions difficult to understand. Robinson believes that it indicates that had Chaucer written more freely composed prose it would have been superior to his translations of Boethius and Renaut de Louhans.

Chaucer’s exact source is undetermined, but most of his ‘conclusions’ go back, directly or indirectly, to Compositio et Operatio Astrolabii, a Latin translation of Messahala's Arabic treatise of the 8th century. His description of the instrument amplifies Messahala’s, and Chaucer’s indebtedness to Messahala was recognised by John Selden and established by Walter William Skeat. Mark Harvey Liddell held Chaucer drew on De Sphaera of John de Sacrobosco for the substance of his astronomical definitions and descriptions, but the non-correspondence in language suggests the probable use of an alternative compilation. A collotype facsimile of the second part of the Latin text of Messahala (the portion which is parallel to Chaucer's) is found in Skeat’s Treatise On The Astrolabe. and in Gunther's Chaucer and Messahalla on the Astrolabe.

Paul Kunitzsch argued that the treatise on the astrolabe long attributed to Messahala was in fact written by Ibn al-Saffar.

=== Language ===
The work is written in the free-flowing Middle English of that time (1391). Chaucer explains this departure from the norm thus:

"This treatis, ..., wol I shewe the ... in Englissh, for Latyn ne canst thou yit but small" (Note: Line numbers are taken from the edition of Robinson (1983) and they refer to this edition only.) (Note: "This treatise, ..., will I show you ... in English, for Latin you can only as yet [understand] a little")

Chaucer proceeds to labour the point somewhat:

"Grekes ... in Grek; and to Arabiens in Arabik, and to Jewes in Ebrew, and to Latyn folk in Latyn; whiche Latyn folk had hem [conclusions] first out of othere dyverse languages, and writen hem in her owne tunge, that is to seyn, in Latyn.". (Note: "Greeks ... in Greek; and to Arabians in Arabic, and to Jews in Hebrew, and to Latin people in Latin. Latin people had them [results] first out of other diverse languages and wrote them in their own tongue, that is to say, in Latin.")

He continues to explain that it easier for a child to understand things in his own language than struggle with unfamiliar grammar, a commonplace idea today but radical in the fourteenth century. Finally, he appeals to Royalty. Philippa Roet, Chaucer's wife was a lady-in-waiting to Philippa of Hainault, Edward III's queen. She was also a sister to Katherine Swynford, John of Gaunt's wife. Chaucer's appeal is an early version of the phrase "the King's English":

"And preie God save the King, that is lord of this language, ..." (Note: preie = pray)

=== Manuscripts ===
Skeat identifies 22 manuscripts of varying quality. The best he labels A, B and C which are MS. Dd. 3.53 (part 2) in the Cambridge University Library, MS. E Museo 54 in the Bodleian Library and MS. Rawlinson, Misc. 1262 also in the Bodleian. A and B were apparently written by the same scribe, but A has been corrected by another hand. Skeat observes that the errors are just those described in "Chaucers Wordes unto Adam, His Owne Scriveyn":

"So ofte a-daye I mot thy werk renewe,
"It to correcte and eek to rubbe and scrape;
"And al is thorough thy negligence and rape." (Note: "Often, I must redo your day's work, "Correct it and even rubout and scrape [the ink off the surface]; "All due to your negligence and corruption [of the text].")

A has indeed been rubbed and scraped then corrected by another hand. This latter scribe Skeat believes to be a better writer than the first. To this second writer was the insertion of diagrams entrusted. A and B were apparently written in London about the year 1400, that is some 9 years after the original composition. Manuscript C is also early, perhaps 1420 and closely agrees with A.

== Audience ==
Chaucer opens with the words "Lyte Lowys my sone". (Note: "Little Lewis, my son") In the past a question arose whether the Lowys was Chaucer's son or some other child he was in close contact with. Kittredge suggested that it could be Lewis Clifford, a son of a friend and possible a godson of Chaucer's. As evidence he advanced that Lewis Clifford died in October 1391, the year of the composition, which could explain its abandonment. Robinson reports though the finding of a document by Professor Manly "recently" (to 1957) which links one Lewis Chaucer with Geoffrey's eldest child Thomas Chaucer. The likelihood therefore is that the dedication can be taken at face value.

Chaucer had an eye to the wider public as well. In the prologue he says:

Now wol I preie mekely every discret persone that redith or herith this litel tretys..." (Note: "Now I would meekly ask every individual person that reads or hears this little treatise...")

== Structure ==
The work was planned to have an introduction and five sections:

1. A description of the astrolabe
2. A rudimentary course in using the instrument
3. Various tables of longitudes, latitudes, declinations, etc.
4. A "theorike" (theory) of the motion of the celestial bodies, in particular a table showing the "very moving of the moon"
5. An introduction to the broader field of "astrologie," a word which at the time referred to the entire span of what we now divide into astrology and astronomy.

Part 1 is complete and extant. Part 2 is also extant with certain caveats described below. Part 3, if it ever existed, is not extant as part of the Treatise. Part 4 was, in the opinion of Skeat, probably never written. Part 5 also was probably never written which Skeat approves of. Indeed, he draws attention to Chaucer's comment at the end of conclusion 4:

"Natheles these ben observaunces of judicial matere and rytes of payens, in whiche my spirit hath no feith, no knowing of her horoscopum." (Note: "Nevertheless, these are observances of judicial matters and pagan rites, in which my spirit has no faith, nor knowledge of its horoscope.")

=== Part 1 ===
The whole of this section describes the form of an astrolabe. The astrolabe is based on a large plate ("The moder" or "mother") which is arranged to hang vertically from a thumb ring. It has "a large hool, that resceiveth in hir wombe the thin plates". (Note: "a large hole that can have thin plates inserted into its womb") The back of the astrolabe is engraved with various scales (see Skeat's sketch below). Mounted on the back is a sighting rule (Skeat's fig 3, below) "a brod rule, that hath on either end a square plate perced with certein holes". (Note: "a broad rule that has on each end a square plate pierced with a number of holes") To hold it all together there is a "pyn" with a "littel wegge" (wedge) as shown below at Skeat's fig 7. Into the "womb" various thin plates can be inserted which are designed for a particular place: "compowned after the latitude of Oxenforde". (Note: "constructed for the latitude of Oxford") These plates show the star map. Surmounting them is a "riet" or "rete" which is a pierced framework carrying the major stars shown at fig 9. Outside all is another rule, this time not with sighting holes, mounted on the common pivot, see fig 6.

=== Part 2 ===
Part 2 consists of around 40 propositions or descriptions of things that can be done with the astrolabe. The exact number is uncertain since of the later propositions some are of disputed or doubtful authenticity. Skeat accepts that propositions 1-40 are unambiguously genuine. Robinson generally follows Skeat's reasoning. These first 40 propositions form the canon of part 2; the propositions that follow are usually labeled "Supplementary Propositions."

== The astrolabe ==
The astrolabe was a sophisticated precision instrument. With it one could determine the date, time (when the sky was clear), the position of stars, the passage of the zodiac, latitude on the earth's surface, tides and basic surveying. Care must be taken not to dismiss the astrological aspects; as well as any mystical interpretation astrological terminology was used for what today would be recognized as astronomy. Determining when the sun entered a house (or sign) of the zodiac was a precise determination of the calendar.

Skeat produced a number of sketches to accompany his edition:

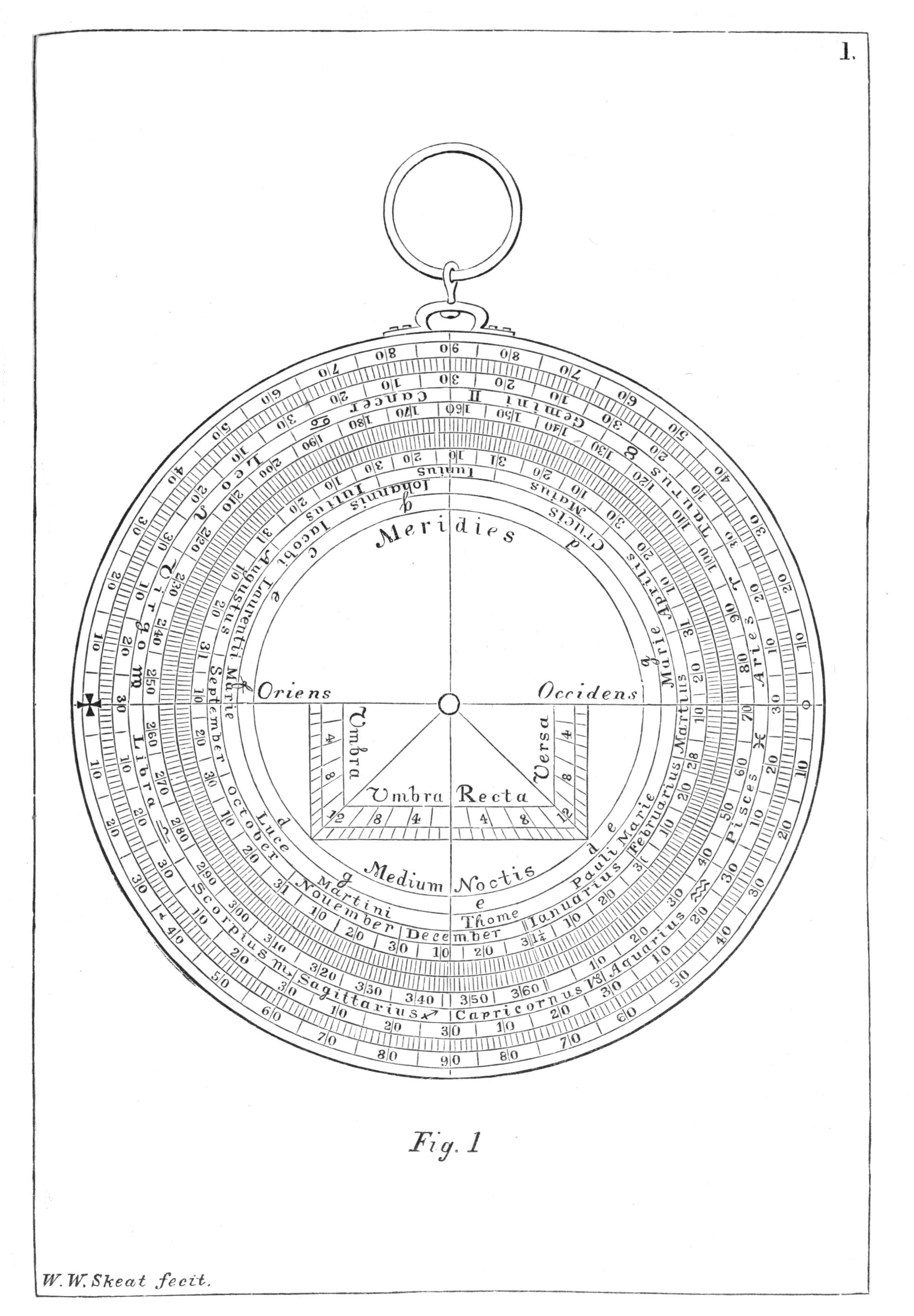
The back of the Astrolabe

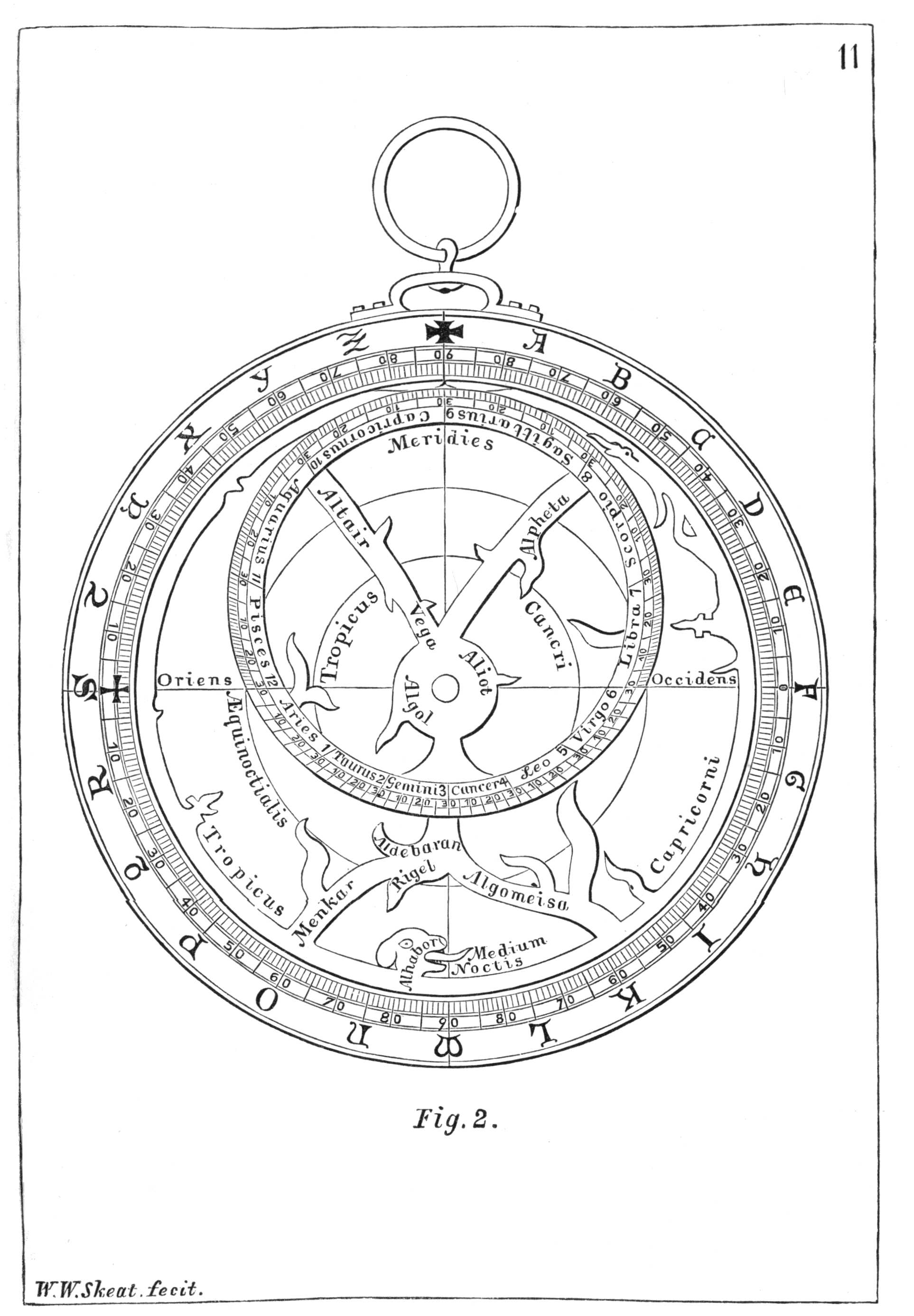
The front of the astrolabe, fully assembled

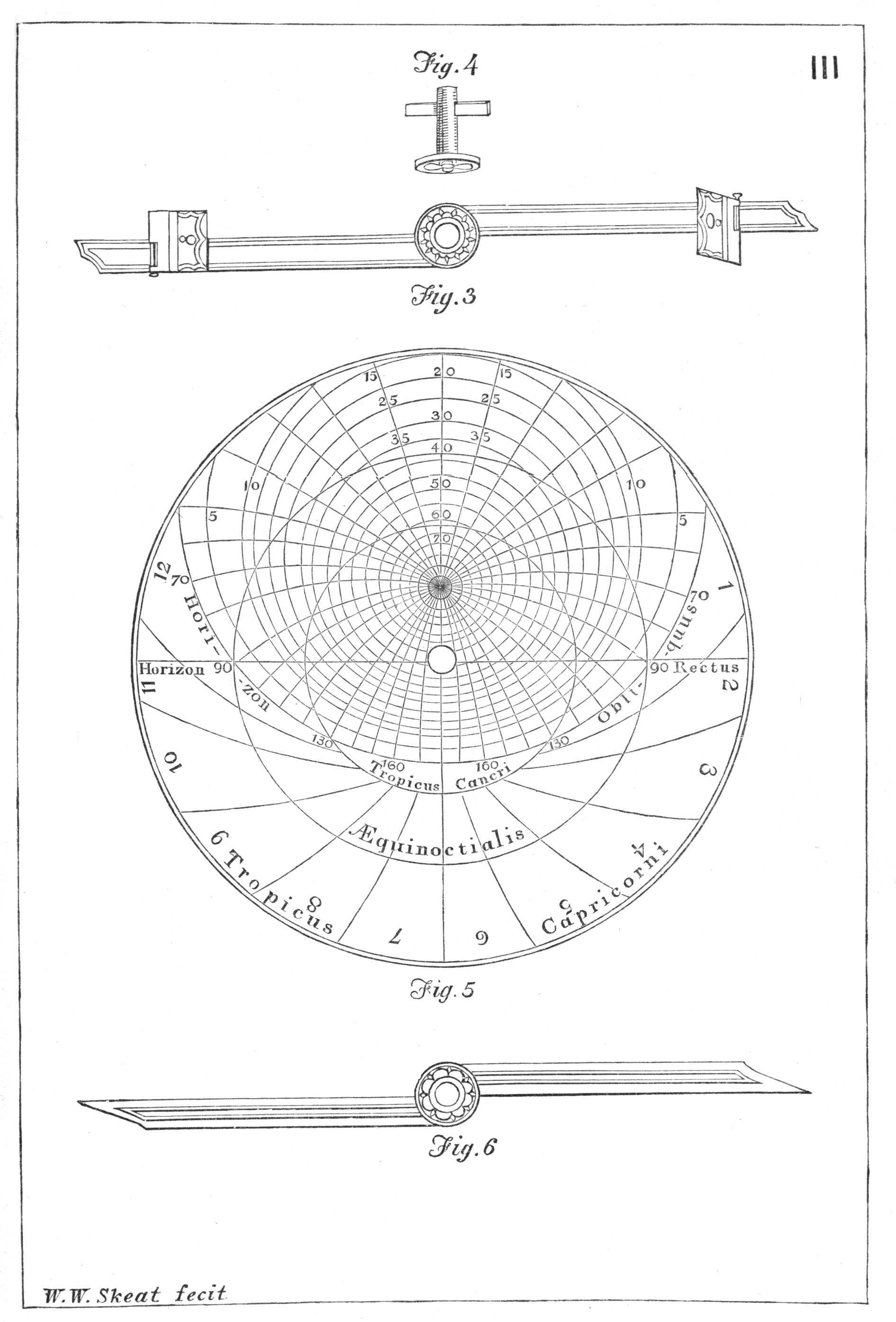
The rewle [rule], pin (with wedge) and disc for Oxford

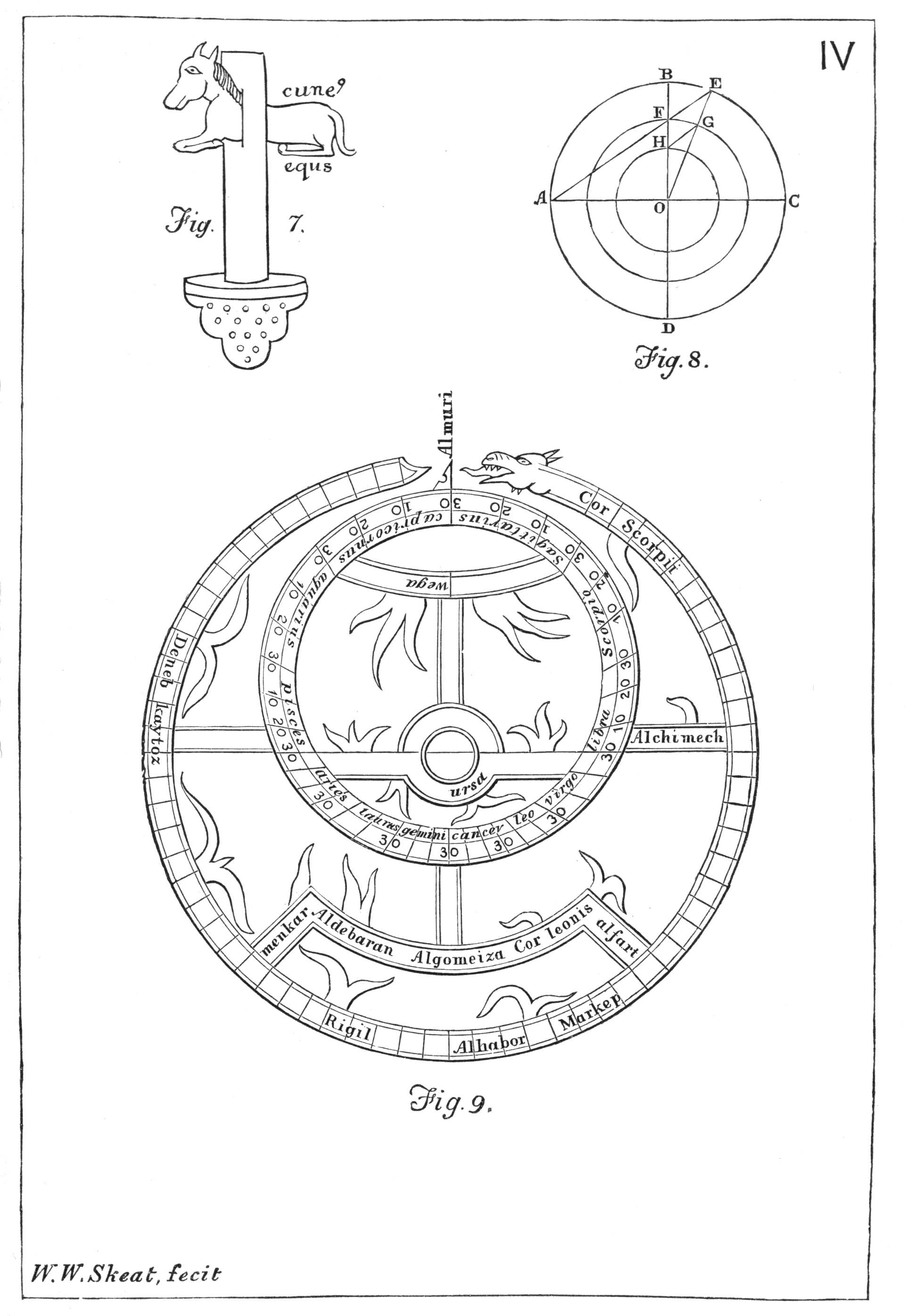
Another form of the pin with a horse wedge, how to draw the three "principal circles" and a rete

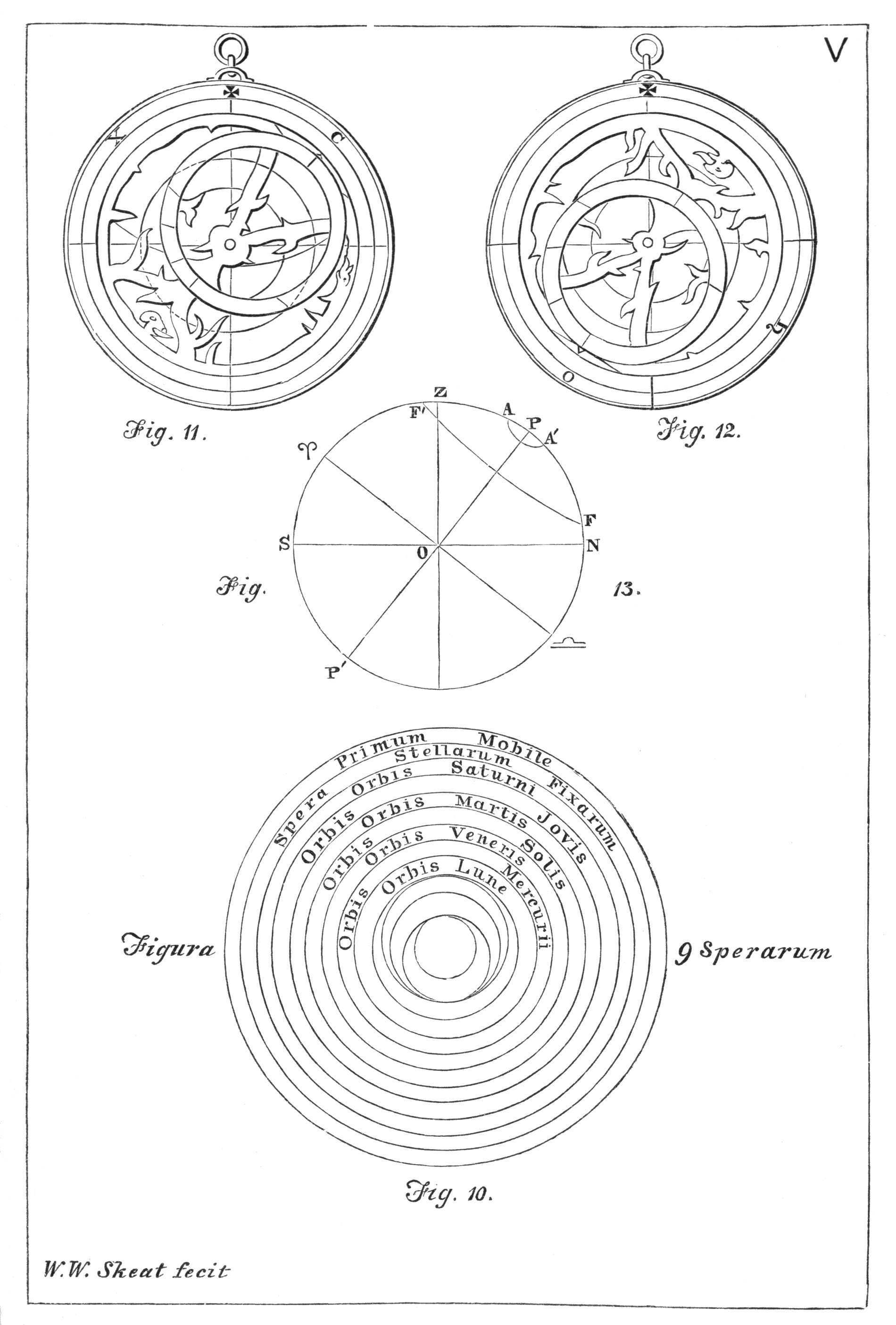
The nine spheres, rete fixing the time of day at 9 am, rete at 20:08, elevation of the pole

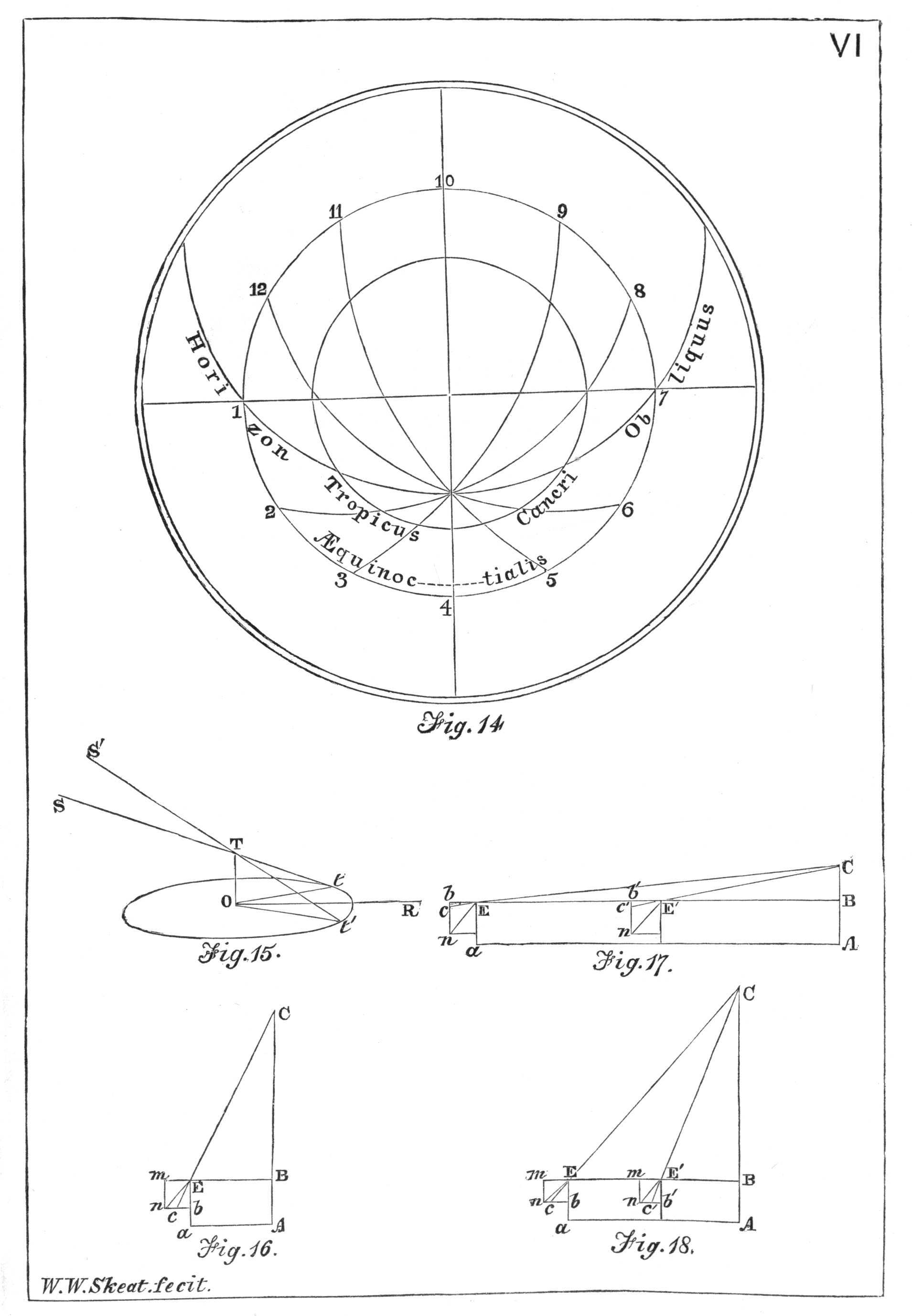
Disc showing the 12 houses, How to obtain the meridional line from two shadows, Umbra Recta, Umbra Versa, Umbra Versa from two observations

== See also ==
- The equatorie of the planetis by John Westwyk
