= John North (historian) =

British historian of science (1934–2008)

- Born: John David North; 19 May 1934; Cheltenham, Gloucestershire, England
- Died: 31 October 2008 (aged 74)
- Education: Batley Grammar School; Merton College, Oxford; University of London
- Occupations: Historian; author
- Spouse: Marion (m. 1957)

John David North (19 May 1934 – 31 October 2008) was a British historian of science and author of numerous books.

North was born in Cheltenham, Gloucestershire in 1934. He attended Batley Grammar School and Merton College, Oxford, where he studied Mathematics and later Philosophy, Politics and Economics. He met his wife Marion in Oxford, and married her in 1957. Later he went to London University where he took an external degree in Astronomy, Physics and Applied Maths in 1958.

His first book was The Measure of the Universe: a History of Modern Cosmology (1965), which was praised as "a virtually complete history of modern cosmology". Not long after he started studying medieval science as he had been appointed librarian and assistant curator of the Museum of the History of Science, Oxford. He was appointed Professor of History of Philosophy and the Exact Sciences at the University of Groningen, Netherlands in 1977, where he stayed until his retirement in 1999. North was elected a member of the Royal Netherlands Academy of Arts and Sciences in 1985. He wrote two books on mediaeval scientist and mathematician Richard of Wallingford. He was also briefly a member of the British Astronomical Association in the 1950s.

North was diagnosed with cancer in 2005, and died on 31 October 2008.

== Bibliography ==
- The Measure of the Universe: a History of Modern Cosmology (1965)
- Medieval Star Catalogues and the Movement of the Eighth Sphere (1967)
- Richard Wallingford: an edition of his writings (1976)
- Horoscopes and History (1986)
- 1348 and All that: Science in Late Medieval Oxford (1987)
- The Alfonsine Books and Some Astrological Techniques (1987)
- Coordinates and Categories: The Graphical Representation of Functions in Medieval Astronomy (1987)
- Chaucer's Universe (1988)
- Stars, Minds and Fate: Essays in Ancient and Mediaeval Cosmology (1989)
- The Early Years (1990)
- Astronomy and Mathematics (1992)
- Natural Philosophy in Late Medieval Oxford (1992)
- The Fontana History of Astronomy and Cosmology (1994)
- Stonehenge: Neolithic man and the cosmos (1996)
- The Ambassadors' Secret: Holbein and the world of the Renaissance (2002)
- God's Clockmaker: Richard of Wallingford and the invention of time (2005)
- Cosmos: an Illustrated History of Astronomy and Cosmology (2008) [an expanded edition of his Fontana History]
