= Altmetric =

Data science company that tracks online mentions of published research

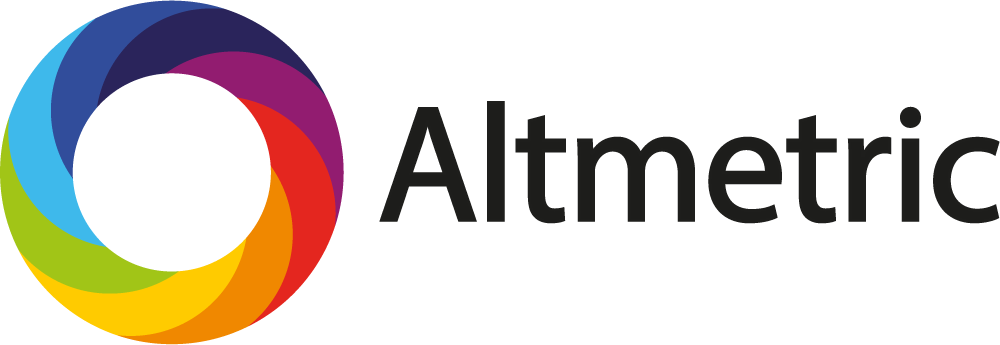
- Official Altmetric Logo
- Website: www.altmetric.com
- Commercial: Yes
- Launched: 2012
- Current status: Active

Altmetric, or altmetric.com, is a data science company that tracks where published research is mentioned online, and provides tools and services to institutions, publishers, researchers, funders and other organisations to monitor this activity, commonly referred to as altmetrics. Altmetric was recognized by European Commissioner Máire Geoghegan-Quinn in 2014 as a company challenging the traditional reputation systems.

Altmetric is a portfolio company of Digital Science, which is owned by Holtzbrinck Publishing Group.

== History ==
Altmetric was founded by Euan Adie in 2011. Previously a researcher, Adie had already worked on Postgenomic.com, an open source scientific blog aggregator founded in 2006. In 2011, Adie entered an altmetrics app into Elsevier's Apps for Science competition and won. The prize money enabled Altmetric to develop a full version of the Altmetric Explorer, released in February 2012.

In July 2012, Altmetric took on additional investment from Digital Science, before being fully acquired in 2016. Altmetric is still a part of the Digital Science group today, with offices in London, Germany, the United States and Australia.

In 2019 Altmetric and Nature received funding from the Google Digital News Innovation Fund to "build a novel tool for measuring the impact of journalism".

== Concept ==
A term first coined in the altmetrics manifesto in 2010, altmetrics (also known as 'alternative metrics') were developed to provide authors and other stakeholders a more comprehensive record of engagement with scholarly work, particularly that which takes place beyond the academy amongst a broader audience. In order to do this, Altmetric tracks a range of online sites and sources looking for 'mentions' (links or written references) to scholarly outputs (which include journal articles, blogs, data sets and more). Sources of the attention include the mainstream media, public policy documents, social and academic networks, post-publication peer-review forums and, more recently, Wikipedia and the Open Syllabus Project.

The data are tracked in real-time and collated in the Altmetric details pages, which provide a clickable summary of all of the online attention relating to a single research output.

== The Altmetric Attention Score and Donut Badge ==
Altmetric employs an algorithm to assign each item an automatically calculated score. Based on the volume and source of attention an item has received, the score is intended to reflect the reach or popularity of the research output. A multicolored 'donut' visualization is also generated to provide a summary of the sources of the attention that an item has received (red for news, light blue for Twitter, etc.). Altmetric make the data available via the Altmetric Bookmarklet, a browser plugin, the Explorer platform, a cloud-hosted database, and API.

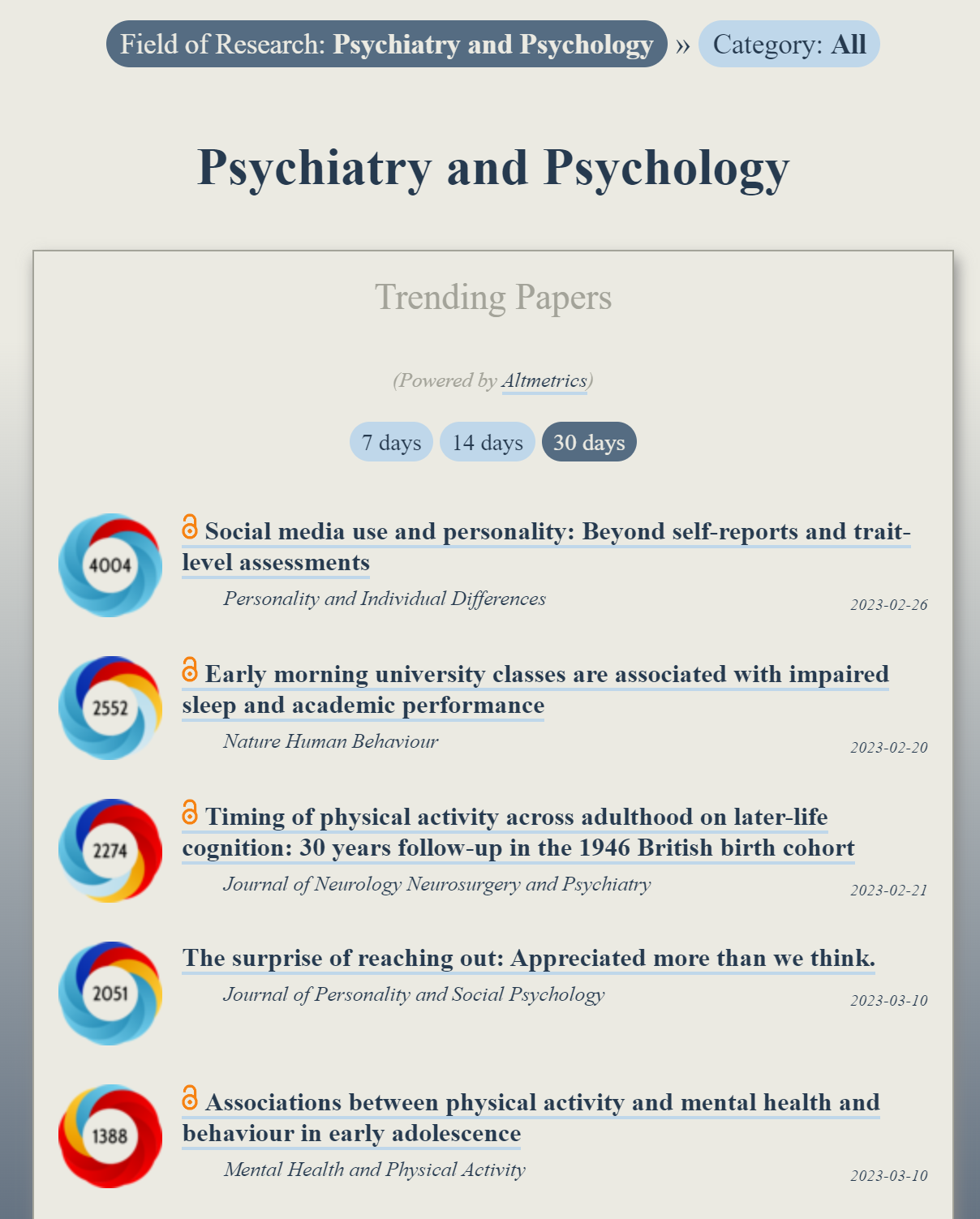
Trending papers from peer-reviewed psychology journals based on their Altmetric Attention Scores.

The sources include academic citations and academic platforms, patents, posts on social media and web forums, Wikipedia articles, users on Mendeley.

Many publishers, including John Wiley & Sons, Taylor and Francis, The JAMA Network and Springer Nature embed the Altmetric 'Donut' Badges into their journal article and book pages to show the Altmetric score for individual items from within the publisher platform. At least one website, OOIR, is specifically built around the showcase of scientific trends based on Altmetric Attention Scores. Even though there is no clear link between altmetric scores and societal impact, they can be used to predict future citation impact, and may be a target for manipulation.

== See also ==
- figshare
- Plum Analytics
- OOIR
