= Initiative for Open Citations =

Project for improving citation analysis

- Abbreviation: I4OC
- Formation: April 6, 2017; 9 years ago
- Legal status: Active
- Purpose: Unrestricted availability of scholarly citation data
- Website: i4oc.org

The Initiative for Open Citations (I4OC) is a project launched publicly in April 2017, that describes itself as: "a collaboration between scholarly publishers, researchers, and other interested parties to promote the unrestricted availability of scholarly citation data and to make these data available." It is intended to facilitate improved citation analysis.

== Methodology ==
The citations are stored in Crossref and are made available through the Crossref REST API. They are also available from the OpenCitations Corpus, a database that harvests citation data from Crossref and other sources. The data are considered by those involved in the Initiative to be in the public domain, and so a CC0 licence is used. The stated benefits of this approach are: 1. discoverability of published content; 2. the building of new services, and 3. creation of a public citation graph to explore connections between knowledge fields. The Royal Society of Chemistry earmarked the I4OC as a feature of excellence in publishing, and IOP Publishing participates to implement their commitment to the San Francisco Declaration on Research Assessment.

== Launch ==
The initiative was established in response to a paper on citations in Wikidata, Citations needed for the sum of all human knowledge: Wikidata as the missing link between scholarly publishing and linked open data, given by Dario Taraborelli, head of research at the Wikimedia Foundation, at the eighth Conference on Open Access Scholarly Publishing, in September 2016. At that time, only 1% of papers in Crossref had citations metadata that were freely available. By the time of the public launch, on 6 April 2017, that had risen to 40% as a result of setting up the initiative.

The founding partners were:

- OpenCitations
- Wikimedia Foundation
- PLOS
- eLife
- DataCite
- The Centre for Culture and Technology at Curtin University

At the time of launch, 64 organisations, including the Wellcome Trust, the Bill And Melinda Gates Foundation and the Alfred P. Sloan Foundation, had endorsed the project and as of May, 2017, Sloan Foundation confirmed it would be providing funding. 29 of these organisations were publishers who had agreed to share their citation metadata openly. These include Springer Nature, Taylor & Francis, and Wiley. On 11 July 2017, the Initiative announced that a further sixteen publishers had signed up. On 8 August 2017, the Initiative released on open letter to stakeholders. The same month, the British Library became a member organisation.

== Growth ==
Elsevier, who contribute 30% of the citation metadata in Crossref, did not initially join the initiative. In April 2017, Elsevier's vice-president of corporate relations, Tom Reller, said:

We are aware of the initiative but want to learn more before making a decision on whether to participate.

In January 2019, the Editorial board of Elsevier's Journal of Informetrics resigned and launched the new journal Quantitative Science Studies, citing Elsevier's lack of support for the I4OC as one of the main reasons for the move. Elsevier claimed in response that they could not release their data for free due to loss of licensing revenue from their proprietary Scopus citation services. Elsevier finally joined the initiative in January 2021 after the data was already available with an Open Data Commons license in Microsoft Academic.

In August 2022, the number of articles whose reference lists were free to access and reuse exceeded 60 million, out of 134 million articles indexed by Crossref.

== See also ==
- Citebase
- Initiative for Open Abstracts
