= List of bibliometrics software =

This is a list of bibliometrics software.

Software	Developer	First public release	Latest stable release date	Latest stable version	Cost (USD)	Free software	License	Notes
BibExcel	Olle Persson	2009	2017	Unknown	Free	No		
Bibliometrix	K-Synth Srl University of Naples Federico II	Unknown	Unknown	Unknown	Free	Yes		RStudio package
Biblioshiny	K-Synth Srl University of Naples Federico II	Unknown	Unknown	Unknown	Free	Yes		Online application
Citation Gecko								
CiteSpace								
CitNetExplorer								
Connected Papers								
DFR-Browser								
HistCite								
MyScienceWork								
NetDraw								
Open Knowledge Map								
Pajak	Vladamir Batagelj and Andrej Mrvar							
PoP (Publish or Perish)	Anne-Wil Harzing							
Publimetra					Free	Free		Online application
QDA Miner Lite								
Scholarometer								
Sci2								
ScientoMiner								
SCiMAT								
Scite								
SciVal								
SITKIS								
UCInet								
VOSviewer	Centre for Science and Technology Studies Leiden University	2009	2023-01-23	1.6.19	Free	Yes		
