= Technical Information Project =

The Technical Information Project (TIP) was an early database project focused on the scholarly physics literature. Its "most unique feature" was its use bibliographic coupling, a novel way to search for related documents. The TIP included over 25,000 records.

Meyer Mike Kessler began developing the TIP at MIT in April 1962, with the support of a grant by the National Science Foundation. The project's objective was to create a system that could "perform automatic search operations on bibliographic data" using bibliographic coupling. Some of the innovations in TIP included the use of wild cards, and boolean searching.

== Transfer to the American Institute of Physics ==
Around 1968, responsibility for the TIP was transferred to the American Institute of Physics, under the direction of Dr. H. William Koch. In connection with the transfer, the Institute received a $149,000 NSF grant meant to address problems "produced by the rapid growth of the published [physics] literature, which threatens a breakdown in communications among scientists". The Institute aimed to create a nationwide "physics information network" by adding indexing information to the TIP, and using it to automatically produce classification indexes for its 38 physics journals, as part of a planned "National Physics Information System".
