= Citation analysis =

Examination of the frequency, patterns, and graphs of citations in documents

Citation analysis is the examination of the frequency, patterns, and graphs of citations in documents. It uses the directed graph of citations – links from one document to another document – to reveal properties of the documents. A typical aim would be to identify the most important documents in a collection. A classic example is that of the citations between academic articles and books. For another example, judges of law support their judgements by referring back to judgements made in earlier cases (see citation analysis in a legal context). An additional example is provided by patents which contain prior art, citation of earlier patents relevant to the current claim. The digitization of patent data and increasing computing power have led to a community of practice that uses these citation data to measure innovation attributes, trace knowledge flows, and map innovation networks.

Documents can be associated with many other features in addition to citations, such as authors, publishers, journals as well as their actual texts. The general analysis of collections of documents is known as bibliometrics and citation analysis is a key part of that field. For example, bibliographic coupling and co-citation are association measures based on citation analysis (shared citations or shared references). The citations in a collection of documents can also be represented in forms such as a citation graph, as pointed out by Derek J. de Solla Price in his 1965 article "Networks of Scientific Papers". This means that citation analysis draws on aspects of social network analysis and network science.

An early example of automated citation indexing was CiteSeer, which was used for citations between academic papers, while Web of Science is an example of a modern system which includes more than just academic books and articles reflecting a wider range of information sources. Today, automated citation indexing has changed the nature of citation analysis research, allowing millions of citations to be analyzed for large-scale patterns and knowledge discovery. Citation analysis tools can be used to compute various impact measures for scholars based on data from citation indices. (Note: Examples include subscription-based tools based on proprietary data, such as Web of Science and Scopus, and free tools based on open data, such as Scholarometer by Filippo Menczer and his team.) These have various applications, from the identification of expert referees to review papers and grant proposals, to providing transparent data in support of academic merit review, tenure, and promotion decisions. This competition for limited resources may lead to ethically questionable behavior to increase citations.

A great deal of criticism has been made of the practice of naively using citation analyses to compare the impact of different scholarly articles without taking into account other factors which may affect citation patterns. Among these criticisms, a recurrent one focuses on "field-dependent factors", which refers to the fact that citation practices vary from one area of science to another, and even between fields of research within a discipline.

== Overview ==
While citation indexes were originally designed for information retrieval, they are increasingly used for bibliometrics and other studies involving research evaluation. Citation data is also the basis of the popular journal impact factor.

There is a large body of literature on citation analysis, sometimes called scientometrics, a term invented by Vasily Nalimov, or more specifically bibliometrics. The field blossomed with the advent of the Science Citation Index, which now covers source literature from 1900 on. The leading journals of the field are Scientometrics, Informetrics, and the Journal of the Association for Information Science and Technology. ASIST also hosts an electronic mailing list called SIGMETRICS at ASIST. This method is undergoing a resurgence based on the wide dissemination of the Web of Science and Scopus subscription databases in many universities, and the universally available free citation tools such as CiteBase, CiteSeerX, Google Scholar, and the former Windows Live Academic (now available with extra features as Microsoft Academic). Methods of citation analysis research include qualitative, quantitative and computational approaches. The main foci of such scientometric studies have included productivity comparisons, institutional research rankings, journal rankings establishing faculty productivity and tenure standards, assessing the influence of top scholarly articles, tracing the development trajectory of a science or technology field, and developing profiles of top authors and institutions in terms of research performance.

Legal citation analysis is a citation analysis technique for analyzing legal documents to facilitate the understanding of the inter-related regulatory compliance documents by the exploration the citations that connect provisions to other provisions within the same document or between different documents. Legal citation analysis uses a citation graph extracted from a regulatory document, which could supplement E-discovery - a process that leverages on technological innovations in big data analytics.

== History ==
In a 1965 paper, Derek J. de Solla Price described the inherent linking characteristic of the SCI as "Networks of Scientific Papers". The links between citing and cited papers became dynamic when the SCI began to be published online. The Social Sciences Citation Index became one of the first databases to be mounted on the Dialog system in 1972. With the advent of the CD-ROM edition, linking became even easier and enabled the use of bibliographic coupling for finding related records. In 1973, Henry Small published his classic work on Co-Citation analysis which became a self-organizing classification system that led to document clustering experiments and eventually an "Atlas of Science" later called "Research Reviews".

The inherent topological and graphical nature of the worldwide citation network which is an inherent property of the scientific literature was described by Ralph Garner (Drexel University) in 1965.

The use of citation counts to rank journals was a technique used in the early part of the nineteenth century but the systematic ongoing measurement of these counts for scientific journals was initiated by Eugene Garfield at the Institute for Scientific Information who also pioneered the use of these counts to rank authors and papers. In a landmark paper of 1965 he and Irving Sher showed the correlation between citation frequency and eminence in demonstrating that Nobel Prize winners published five times the average number of papers while their work was cited 30 to 50 times the average. In a long series of essays on the Nobel and other prizes Garfield reported this phenomenon. The usual summary measure is known as impact factor, the number of citations to a journal for the previous two years, divided by the number of articles published in those years. It is widely used, both for appropriate and inappropriate purposes – in particular, the use of this measure alone for ranking authors and papers is therefore quite controversial.

In an early study in 1964 of the use of Citation Analysis in writing the history of DNA, Garfield and Sher demonstrated the potential for generating historiographs, topological maps of the most important steps in the history of scientific topics. This work was later automated by E. Garfield, A. I. Pudovkin of the Institute of Marine Biology, Russian Academy of Sciences and V. S. Istomin of Center for Teaching, Learning, and Technology, Washington State University and led to the creation of the HistCite software around 2002.

Automatic citation indexing was introduced in 1998 by Lee Giles, Steve Lawrence and Kurt Bollacker and enabled automatic algorithmic extraction and grouping of citations for any digital academic and scientific document. Where previous citation extraction was a manual process, citation measures could now scale up and be computed for any scholarly and scientific field and document venue, not just those selected by organizations such as ISI. This led to the creation of new systems for public and automated citation indexing, the first being CiteSeer (now CiteSeerX, soon followed by Cora, which focused primarily on the field of computer science and information science. These were later followed by large scale academic domain citation systems such as the Google Scholar and Microsoft Academic. Such autonomous citation indexing is not yet perfect in citation extraction or citation clustering with an error rate estimated by some at 10% though a careful statistical sampling has yet to be done. This has resulted in such authors as Ann Arbor, Milton Keynes, and Walton Hall being credited with extensive academic output. SCI claims to create automatic citation indexing through purely programmatic methods. Even the older records have a similar magnitude of error.

== Citation impact ==
Citation impact, also known as citation metric, is a measure of how often an academic article, journal, book, author, or institution is cited. Citation count is a raw score equal to the number of citations received (considered in a given citation index) while citation frequency or citation rate is a normalized value given by the ratio of citation counts to number articles published by the journal or author group during a given time period; for example, 5 citations received by 10 articles would result in a citation frequency of 0.5=5/10.

Citation metrics, such as the journal impact factor or the citescore, are interpreted as measures of the impact or influence of academic work and have given rise to the field of bibliometrics or scientometrics, specializing in the study of patterns of academic impact through citation analysis. The importance of journals can be measured by the average citation rate, It is used by academic institutions in decisions about academic tenure, promotion and hiring, and hence also used by authors in deciding which journal to publish in. Citation-like measures are also used in other fields that do ranking, such as Google's PageRank algorithm, software metrics, college and university rankings, and business performance indicators.

== Citation analysis for legal documents ==
Citation analysis for legal documents is an approach to facilitate the understanding and analysis of inter-related regulatory compliance documents by exploration of the citations that connect provisions to other provisions within the same document or between different documents. Citation analysis uses a citation graph extracted from a regulatory document, which could supplement E-discovery - a process that leverages on technological innovations in big data analytics.

== Citation analysis for plagiarism detection ==
Citation-based plagiarism detection (CbPD) relies on citation analysis, and is the only approach to plagiarism detection that does not rely on the textual similarity. CbPD examines the citation and reference information in texts to identify similar patterns in the citation sequences. As such, this approach is suitable for scientific texts, or other academic documents that contain citations. Citation analysis to detect plagiarism is a relatively young concept. It has not been adopted by commercial software, but a first prototype of a citation-based plagiarism detection system exists. Similar order and proximity of citations in the examined documents are the main criteria used to compute citation pattern similarities. Citation patterns represent subsequences non-exclusively containing citations shared by the documents compared. Factors, including the absolute number or relative fraction of shared citations in the pattern, as well as the probability that citations co-occur in a document are also considered to quantify the patterns' degree of similarity.

== Citation analysis for natural language processing ==
Natural language processing (NLP), a field at the intersection of artificial intelligence and linguistics is poised to substantially impact society through various innovations such as large language models. The impact on and of NLP has been extensively studied through citations. Researchers have analyzed various factors such as the cross-field influence between different fields, industry impact, temporal citation patterns, plagiarism, geographic location, and gender. Many studies show the field is becoming more insular, with a narrowing focus, reduced interdisciplinarity, and concentration of funding across few industry actors.

== Controversies ==
- E-publishing: due to the unprecedented growth of electronic resource (e-resource) availability, one of the questions currently being explored is, "how often are e-resources being cited in my field?" For instance, there are claims that On-Line access to computer science literature leads to higher citation rates, however, humanities articles may suffer if not in print.
- Self-citations: it has been criticized that authors game the system by accumulating citations by citing themselves excessively. For instance, it has been found that men tend to cite themselves more often than women.
- Citation pollution: the infiltration of retracted research, or fake research, being cited in legitimate research, but negatively impacting on the validity of the research. It is due to various factors, including the publication race and the concerning rise in unscrupulous business practices related to so-called predatory or deceptive publishers, research quality, in general, is facing different types of threats.
- Citation justice and citation bias: Because having others cite a publication helps the original author's career prospects, and because the key works in some fields were published by men, by older scholars, and by white people, there have been calls to promote social justice by deliberately citing publications by people from marginalized backgrounds, or by checking citations for bias before publication.

== See also ==
- Journalology
- Main path analysis
- PageRank
- San Francisco Declaration on Research Assessment
