= Citebase =

Former citation index

Citebase Search was an experimental, semi-autonomous citation index for free, online research literature created at the University of Southampton as part of the Open Citation Project. It harvested open access e-prints (most author self-archived) from OAI-PMH compliant archives, parses and links their references and indexes the metadata in a Xapian-based search engine. Citebase went live in 2005 and ceased operation in 2013.

More than three-quarters of the papers indexed were author self-archived in the ArXiv archive, which includes physics, maths and computer science. Some (published) biomedical papers were indexed from BioMed Central and PubMed Central.

== See also ==
- EPrints
- Citeseer
- NASA ADS
- Stanford Physics Information Retrieval System
