= OpenCitations =

Project to publish open access citations

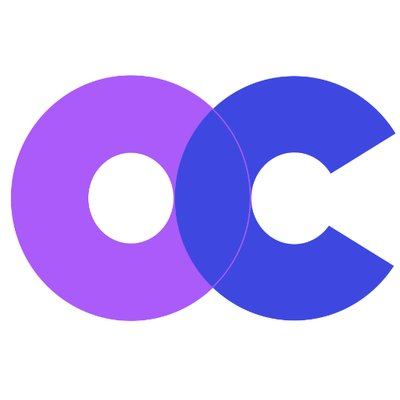
- History: 2010-present

Access
- Cost: Free

Links
- Website: opencitations.net

OpenCitations (established in 2010) is a project aiming to publish open bibliographic citation information in RDF. It produces the "OpenCitations Corpus" citation database in the process.

== Datasets ==
OpenCitations publishes the following datasets which encompass bibliographic data, citation metadata, and in-text reference data. The datasets can be accessed via SPARQL, a REST API, as dumps on Figshare, as individual bibliographic entities, or using OSCAR (OpenCitations RDF Search Application) or Lucinda (The OpenCitations RDF Resource Browser).

=== OpenCitations Corpus ===
The OpenCitations Corpus (OCC) is an open repository of scholarly citation data. The repository is released under the CC0 public domain to ensure that the scholarly citation data is open to all.

As of March 19, 2022, the OCC has ingested the references from 326,743 citing bibliographic resources and contains information about 13,964,148 citation links to 7,565,367 cited resources.

=== OpenCitations Indexes ===
The OpenCitations Indexes are collections of citations, which treat citations as first-class data objects that include citation metadata, as well as identifiers to the citing and cited works. For example, COCI is the OpenCitations Index of Crossref open DOI-to-DOI citations. A 2021 comparison with other citations tools found that COCI was the smallest in coverage, and a 2020 study found that 54% of the citation links in Web of Science were also in COCI.

=== Open Biomedical Citations in Context Corpus ===
The Open Biomedical Citations in Context Corpus (CCC) is a database of citations providing in-text references, extending OpenCitations records with in-text reference pointer information.

== See also ==
- Initiative for Open Citations
