= Bibliographic coupling =

Bibliographic coupling, like co-citation, is a similarity measure that uses citation analysis to establish a similarity relationship between documents. Bibliographic coupling occurs when two works reference a common third work in their bibliographies. It is an indication that a probability exists that the two works treat a related subject matter.

Two documents are bibliographically coupled if they both cite one or more documents in common. The "coupling strength" of two given documents is higher the more citations to other documents they share. For example, consider documents A and B both citing documents C, D and E. Then documents A and B have a bibliographic coupling strength of 3—the number of elements in the intersection of their two reference lists.

Similarly, two authors are bibliographically coupled if the cumulative reference lists of their respective oeuvres each contain a reference to a common document, and their coupling strength also increases with the citations to other documents that their share. If the cumulative reference list of an author's oeuvre is determined as the multiset union of the documents that the author has co-authored, then the author bibliographic coupling strength of two authors (or more precisely, of their oeuvres) is defined as the size of the multiset intersection of their cumulative reference lists, however.

Bibliographic coupling can be useful in a wide variety of fields, since it helps researchers find related research done in the past. On the other hand, two documents are co-cited if they are both independently cited by one or more documents.

== History ==
The concept of bibliographic coupling was introduced by M. M. Kessler of MIT in a paper published in 1963, and has been embraced in the work of the information scientist Eugene Garfield. It is one of the earliest citation analysis methods for document similarity computation and some have questioned its usefulness, pointing out that two works may reference completely unrelated subject matter in the third. Furthermore, bibliographic coupling is a retrospective similarity measure, meaning the information used to establish the similarity relationship between documents lies in the past and is static, i.e. bibliographic coupling strength cannot change over time, since outgoing citation counts are fixed.

The co-citation analysis approach introduced by Henry Small and published in 1973 addressed this shortcoming of bibliographic coupling by considering a document's incoming citations to assess similarity, a measure that can change over time. Additionally, the co-citation measure reflects the opinion of many authors and thus represents a better indicator of subject similarity.

In 1972 Robert Amsler published a paper describing a measure for determining subject similarity between two documents by fusing bibliographic coupling and co-citation analysis.

In 1981 Howard White and Belver Griffith introduced author co-citation analysis (ACA). Not until 2008 did Dangzhi Zhao and Andreas Strotmann combine their work and that of M. M. Kessler to define author bibliographic coupling analysis (ABCA), noting that as long as authors are active this metric is not static and that it is particularly useful when combined with ACA.

More recently, in 2009, Gipp and Beel introduced a new approach termed Co-citation Proximity Analysis (CPA). CPA is based on the concept of co-citation, but represents a refinement to Small's measure in that CPA additionally considers the placement and proximity of citations within a document's full-text. The assumption is that citations in closer proximity are more likely to exhibit a stronger similarity relationship.

In summary, a chronological overview of citation analysis methods includes:

- Bibliographic coupling (1963)
- Co-citation analysis (published 1973)
- Amsler measure (1972)
- Author co-citation analysis (1981)
- Author bibliographic coupling analysis (2008)
- Co-citation proximity analysis (CPA) (2009)

== Applications ==
Online sites that make use of bibliographic coupling include The Collection of Computer Science Bibliographies and CiteSeer.IST

== See also ==
- Technical Information Project, early exploration of the concept by Meyer Mike Kessler
