= Ralph Garner =

Australia international rugby union player (1927–2012)

- Full name: Ralph Lindsay Garner
- Born: 20 January 1927 Yass, NSW, Australia
- Died: 14 July 2012 (aged 85) Kelso, NSW, Australia

Rugby union career
- Position: Wing
International career
Years	Team	Apps	(Points)
1949	Australia	2	(6)

Ralph Lindsay Garner (20 January 1927 — 14 July 2012) was an Australian rugby union international.

== Early life and education ==
Garner was born in Yass and educated at De La Salle College Armidale and the University of Sydney. He played first-grade for the Sydney University XV and toured New Zealand in 1949 with an Australian Universities representative side.

== Career ==
A speed winger, Garner gained two Wallabies caps on the historic 1949 tour of New Zealand, where they claimed a first ever away series win over the All Blacks. He scored two first-half tries to be the match-winner on debut in the 1st Test in Wellington and for his efforts on tour was named one of five "players of the year" by the NZ Rugby Almanack.

Garner scored a hat-trick for Sydney University to help defeat Eastern Suburbs in the 1951 Shute Shield grand final.

== See also ==
- List of Australia national rugby union players
