= Henry Small (information scientist) =

American information scientist

Henry Small is an author of document co-citation and began his work on co-citation in 1974 with Belver Griffith. This work was crucial in making a connection between the study of co-citation use and scientific specialties within research. The year before, Small worked with the Soviet Intelligence scientist Irina Massakova on co-citation analysis, which they used to define and research the co-citation network. It is useful in determining if a specific field's research is trending. Before emerging as a leading researcher in the field of co-citation, Small worked in the history of science field. He had been researching nuclear physics when he began to do the work that would eventually become co-citation analysis. Small has also written about the science of science, which can be understood as a complete examination of the entire methods performed when studying science and the humanities. In 1987, Small was awarded the Derek de Solla Price award for his work in the field of co-citation.

== Career ==
=== Early work in co-citation ===
Henry Small began his work on mapping scientific frontiers in the mid-1970s. Before moving to this field, he had been working at the American Institute of Physics’s (AIP’s) Niels Bohr Library in New York. This work involved documenting the beginning of the science of nuclear physics. His goal was to discover what was known about nuclear physics in the 1920s and 1930s, including the people and their findings. It was during the course of this work that Small realized he had been doing a form of bibliometrics as part of his methods. He was combining multiple data elements together. It was this work in bibliometrics that he tweaked and then referred to as co-citation.

Small struggled to find prior literature in the field of co-citation when he began his research. Most of what he wrote about he could not find past references to in the literature, and this may have been an issue of classification. After some time, Small did discover a study by an information scientist/linguist written in 1957. This author, Yehoshua Bar-Hillel, wrote about "co-quotation." Small was focused on bibliometrics, however, so he missed this early reference.

=== Co-citation analysis ===
In 1973, Small worked with the Soviet Intelligence scientist Irina Massakova to introduce the term "co-citation network" within the field of science mapping. The intent of this work was to define the relationships between multiple scientific articles and how they relate to a specific topic. With this information, the knowledge growth of a particular field can be measured and tracked. It can also determine the more prominent articles and expertise within that field. This analysis can shine a light on which ideas are more accepted within a field, and which ones are more fringe ideas and theories. The co-citation network that Small and Massakova referenced can be understood to be the reference of two articles together within a third article. Mapping this information reveals trends in the field of scientific study.

=== Work with Belver Griffith ===
Small continued his work in co-citation with Belver Griffith and in 1974, they expanded the process of mapping trends in specialized fields based on co-citation usage. They studied trends of group mechanism and did so observing trends in collagen research up until 1977, when they published their research. How they performed this research was by observing how often citations were grouped together and mapping these occurrences. After studying these instances, what Small and Griffith observed was the disappearance of some of the key documents in first cluster over time. These documents were replaced with different key documents in a second cluster. Their mapping reflected a revolutionary change in how collagen research was developing.

=== Science of science ===
Small, by proposing co-citation analysis, has contributed to the science of science. This field reviews the literature and studies done in multiple fields, including the natural sciences, the social sciences, and art and the humanities. The review of all of these sciences is done with a scientific approach, thus the name "science of science." Small has written about the science of science as being practical and something that can be used by researchers. It will also support multiple methods, including consilience and heuristics.

=== Accolades ===
Small received the Derek de Solla Price Memorial Medal in 1987. This was for his work done in the field of co-citation. A decade later, Small was awarded the ASIS&T Award of Merit for his work in the field of information science.
