= Plum Analytics =

Altmetrics company; part of Elsevier

Plum Analytics was a Philadelphia, Pennsylvania-based altmetrics company dedicated to measuring the influence of scientific research.

== History ==
It was founded in 2011 by Andrea Michalek, who served as President of the company until 2019, and Mike Buschman. Michalek and Buschman met in the product development team at Serials Solutions, which was subsequently integrated into ProQuest.

Plum Analytics was acquired by EBSCO Information Services for an undisclosed amount in 2014, then later sold to Elsevier in February 2017. Its metrics were incorporated into Elsevier's existing products, including Mendeley and Scopus.

== Product and services ==
=== PlumX ===
Plum Analytics is best known for PlumX, which was the company's first product. PlumX is an online tool that provides altmetrics for peer-reviewed journal articles and other scholarly works by aggregating information from different sources including Wikipedia, Mendeley (for bookmarks and downloads), the USPTO (for patents), SSRN (for citation and usage data), Facebook (for shares and Likes), Lexis-Nexis Metabase (for news) and Overton.io (for government policy citations).

In August 2015, Plum Analytics released the "PlumX Suite", which consists of five separate products: Metrics, Dashboards, +Grants, Benchmarks, and Funding Opportunities. These were discontinued once the company was acquired by Elsevier, and PlumX data is now available primarily through badges on Scopus, Mendeley and institutional repositories.

== See also ==
- figshare
- Altmetrics
