= Figshare =

Fileshare website

figshare
- Owner: Digital Science
- Creator: Mark Hahnel
- Website: figshare.com
- Commercial: Yes
- Launched: 2011
- Current status: Active

Figshare is an online open access repository where researchers can preserve and share their research outputs, including figures, datasets, images, and videos. It is free to upload content and free to access, in adherence to the principle of open data. Figshare is one of a number of portfolio businesses supported by Digital Science, a subsidiary of Springer Nature.

== History ==
Figshare was launched in January 2011 by Mark Hahnel and has been supported by Digital Science since a January 2012 relaunch. Hahnel first developed the platform as a personal custom solution for the organization and publication of diverse research products generated in support of his PhD in stem cell biology. In January 2013, Figshare announced a partnership with PLOS to integrate Figshare data hosting, access, and visualization with their associated PLOS articles. In September 2013, the service launched a hosted institutional repository service. In December 2013, they announced integration with ImpactStory to support the collection of altmetrics.

Figshare also hosts the Reproducibility Collection as a founding member of The Reproducibility Initiative, which acts as an independent and blinded validator for replication of submitted data.

Figshare releases 'The State of Open Data' each year to assess the changing academic landscape around open research.

== Concept ==
Researchers can upload all of their research outputs to Figshare, thus making them publicly available. Users can upload files in any format, and items are attributed a DOI. The current 'types' that can be chosen are figures, datasets, media (including video), papers (including pre-prints), posters, code, and filesets (groups of files). All files are released under a Creative Commons license, CC-BY for most files and CC0 (public domain) for datasets. Figshare allows researchers to publish negative data. The withholding of negative publications is a widely known phenomenon that leads to a significant bias, often referred to as the file drawer effect. By encouraging publishing of figures, charts, and data, rather than being limited to the traditional entire 'paper', knowledge can be shared more quickly and effectively. Figshare also tracks the download statistics for hosted materials, acting in turn as a source for altmetrics. The main hosting mechanism for the platform is Amazon S3, with CLOCKSS serving as an additional host for public content. Both of these resources support backup and preservation via a distributed cloud computing network.

== Integration with other platforms ==
Figshare features integration with ORCID, Symplectic Elements, can import items from GitHub, and is a source tracked by Altmetric.com.

== See also ==
- Dryad
- List of preprint repositories
- Open Science Framework
- Zenodo
