= Bibliometrician =

A bibliometrician is a researcher or a specialist in bibliometrics. It is near-synonymous with an informetrician (who studies informetrics), a scientometrician (who studies scientometrics) and a webometrician, who studies webometrics.

== Notable bibliometricians ==
- Christine L. Borgman
- Samuel C. Bradford
- Blaise Cronin
- Margaret Elizabeth Egan
- Eugene Garfield (developer of the Science Citation Index and the Impact factor)
- Jorge E. Hirsch (developer of the h-index)
- Alfred J. Lotka
- Vasily Nalimov
- Derek J. de Solla Price
- Ronald Rousseau
- George Kingsley Zipf

== See also ==
- Institute for Scientific Information
- International Society for Scientometrics and Informetrics (an association of professionals in the fields).
