= Derek de Solla Price Memorial Medal =

Science award

The Derek de Solla Price Memorial Award, or Price Medal, was conceived to honor Derek J. de Solla Price for his contributions to information science and for his crucial role in developing the field of scientometrics. The award was launched by Tibor Braun, founder of the international journal Scientometrics, and is periodically awarded by the journal to scientists with outstanding contributions to the fields of quantitative studies of science. The awarding ceremony is part of the annual ISSI conference. The first medal was awarded to Eugene Garfield in 1984. The full list of winners can be found below.

Year	Winner	Year	Winner
1984	Eugene Garfield	1985	Michael J. Moravcsik
1986	Tibor Braun (es:Tibor_Braun)	1987	Vasily V. Nalimov & Henry Small
1988	Francis Narin	1989	Bertram C. Brookes & Jan Vlachy
1993	Andras Schubert (de:András Schubert)	1995	Anthony F.J. Van Raan & Robert K. Merton
1997	John Irvine & Ben Martin & Belver C. Griffith	1999	Wolfgang Glänzel & Henk F. Moed
2001	Ronald Rousseau & Leo Egghe	2003	Loet Leydesdorff
2005	Peter Ingwersen & Howard D. White	2007	Katherine W. McCain
2009	Peter Vinkler & Michel Zitt	2011	Olle Persson
2013	Blaise Cronin	2015	Mike Thelwall
2017	Judit Bar-Ilan	2019	Lutz Bornmann
2021	Ludo Waltman	2023	Kevin W. Boyack & Richard Klavans
2025	Gunnar Sivertsen		
