= Judit Bar-Ilan =

Israeli computer scientist (1958–2019)

- יהודית בר-אילן
- Born: 1958
- Died: 2019 (aged 60–61)
- Education: Hebrew University of Jerusalem (BS, MS, PhD)
- Known for: Research in informetrics, scientometrics, information retrieval, and web search engines
- Awards: Derek de Solla Price Memorial Medal, Research in Information Science Award
- Scientific career
- Fields: Information science, Informatics, Scientometrics
- Workplaces: Bar-Ilan University
- Doctoral advisor: Michael O. Rabin, Michael Ben-Or

Judit Bar-Ilan (Hebrew: יהודית בר-אילן, 1958–2019) was an Israeli computer scientist known for her research in informetrics and scientometrics. She was a professor of information science, and head of the Department of Information Science at Bar-Ilan University.

== Education and career ==
Bar-Ilan was born in 1958. She was a student at the Hebrew University of Jerusalem, where she earned a bachelor's degree in 1981, an education diploma in 1982, a master's degree in 1983 and a Ph.D. in 1990. Her dissertation, Applications of One-Way Functions and Randomization in Security Protocols, was jointly supervised by Michael O. Rabin and Michael Ben-Or.

After working for a year as a visiting lecturer at the University of Haifa, Bar-Ilan returned to the Hebrew University as an external teacher and later teaching fellow and teacher in library, archive and information studies. She joined the Bar-Ilan University Department of Information Science in 2002, where she was head of department from 2008 to 2012 and was promoted to full professor in 2010.

== Contributions ==
Bar-Ilan did important work early in her career in the fault tolerance of distributed computing, and her dissertation research was in cryptography. However, she is best known for her research on informetrics, scientometrics, information retrieval, and web search engines. Her interest in these topics stemmed from her work in the early 1990s on applications of distributed computing in library science. This work led her to perform important studies in the late 1990s on the accuracy, reliability, and stability over time of search engine results, and on the ability of search engines to handle non-English queries. She also used search engine results to study the link structure of the web, and applied methodologies including content analysis, user surveys, and user studies in these areas. Later in her career, her interests shifted to scientometrics, including citation analysis and studies of the h-index as well as altmetrics for measuring scholarly productivity. She also investigated the patterns of politically motivated internet activity.

== Recognition ==
The International Society for Scientometrics and Informetrics gave Bar-Ilan their Derek de Solla Price Memorial Medal in 2017, "for her distinguished contribution to the field of scientometrics". The Association for Information Science and Technology gave her their Research in Information Science Award in 2018, for "sustained contributions to informetrics, bibliometrics information retrieval, and most recently altmetrics, domains at the core of information science". A special memorial issue dedicated to Judit Bar-Ilan was published in the journal Scientometrics in June 2020.

== Personal life ==
Bar-Ilan died on July 16, 2019.
