= Howard D. White =

Howard D. White (born June 15, 1936 in Salt Lake City, Utah) is a scientist in library and information science with a focus on informetrics and scientometrics.

He has published on bibliometrics and co-citation analysis, evaluation of reference services, expert systems for reference work, innovative online searching, social science data archives, library publicity, American attitudes toward library censorship, and literature retrieval for meta-analysis and interdisciplinary studies.

After taking his Ph.D in librarianship at the University of California, Berkeley, in 1974, White joined the Drexel University College of Information Science and Technology, where he is now professor emeritus.

== Selected publications ==
- White Howard D and Alesia A Zuccala. (2018). “Libcitations Worldcat Cultural Impact and Fame.” Journal of the Association for Information Science and Technology 1502–12.
- White Howard D. (2017). “Relevance Theory and Distributions of Judgments in Document Retrieval.” Information Processing and Management 1080–1102.
- White Howard D. (2015). “Co-Cited Author Retrieval and Relevance Theory: Examples from the Humanities.” Scientometrics : An International Journal for All Quantitative Aspects of the Science of Science Communication in Science and Science Policy 2275–99.
- White Howard D. (2007). “Combining Bibliometrics Information Retrieval and Relevance Theory Part 1: First Examples of a Synthesis.” Journal of the American Society for Information Science and Technology: 536–59.
- White Howard D. 2007. “Combining Bibliometrics Information Retrieval and Relevance Theory Part 2: Some Implications for Information Science.” Journal of the American Society for Information Science and Technology 583–605.
- White Howard D. (2005). “Information Science Fiction.” Bulletin of the American Society for Information Science and Technology: 14–15.
- White Howard D. (1977). Machine-Readable Social Science Data. Philadelphia: Drexel University Graduate School of Library Science.

== Awards ==
In 1993, he won the Research Award of the American Society for Information Science and Technology (ASIST) for distinguished contributions in his field. In 1998, he and Katherine McCain won the best JASIS paper award for "Visualizing a Discipline: An Author Co-Citation Analysis of Information Science, 1972-1995".

He was a Drexel Distinguished Professor for 1998–2002, using the grant awarded to develop the AuthorMap system. In 2004, he won ASIST’s highest honor for career achievement, the Award of Merit . In 2005, the International Society for Scientometrics and Informetrics honored him with the biennial Derek de Solla Price Memorial Medal for contributions to the quantitative study of science.
