= Blaise Cronin =

Irish-American information scientist (born 1949)

Blaise Cronin (born 1949) is an Irish-American information scientist and bibliometrician. He is the Rudy Professor Emeritus of Information Science at Indiana University, Bloomington, where he was Dean of the School of Library and Information Science for seventeen years. From 1985 to 1991, he held the Chair of Information Science and was Head of the Department of Information Science at the University of Strathclyde in Glasgow, U.K.

== Early life, education, and career ==
Cronin was born in Newry, Northern Ireland, in 1949. He was delivered by his grandfather, Dr. Thomas Cronin, who was a surgeon. Cronin's father, Gerald, was the Town Clerk and his mother, Sheila Devenish-Meares, was a music teacher and the leader of the Newry Symphony Orchestra. Cronin wrote about his hometown of Newry in his book titled "Your Newry Bucket List: 70 Things to do in Newry Before You Die."

Cronin began his education at the Abbey Christian Brothers' Grammar School, where he played football. He went on to attend Trinity College Dublin, where he earned a master's degree, and then Queen's University Belfast, where he earned a PhD and a DSSc. Cronin went on to become Head of Department and Professor of Information Science at the University of Strathclyde in Glasgow around 1985. Circa 1990, he became a Rudy Professor Emeritus of Information Science at Indiana University in Bloomington, Indiana. Circa 2009, Cronin became editor-in-chief of the Journal of the Association for Information Science and Technology until 2015.

Cronin is well known for his work in bibliometrics and scientometrics. In over two decades, Cronin has written and edited over 300 research articles, monographs, technical reports, conference papers, and more. He is known for his research "focused on collaboration in science, scholarly communication, citation analysis, the academic reward system and cybermetrics - the intersection of information science and social studies of science." His research focused heavily not only on Information Science but in understanding the importance of acknowledgements in scholarly papers. Through his writing, Cronin argues for consistency and conformity in citation in order to build a more complete picture of how knowledge is shared and disseminated within the scientific community. Cronin's work also includes consulting both in the United Kingdom and abroad in over 30 countries. Additionally, he has been a keynote speaker at various conferences in several different countries. Around the late 1980s and early 1990s, Cronin became a founding co-director for the electronic publishing start-up Crossaig, which was later acquired by ISI.

== Awards and honors ==
- 2014 Jason Farradane Award
- 2013 Derek de Solla Price Memorial Medal for "outstanding contributions to the fields of quantitative studies of science."
- Honorary Visiting professor, Department of Information Science, City University London, 2007–
- Visiting professor, School of Computing, Mathematical and Information Science, University of Brighton, 2007–2010
- Award of Merit, American Society for Information Science and Technology, 2006
- Rudy Professor of Information Science, Indiana University, 1999–
- Talis Information Visiting professor of Information Science, Manchester Metropolitan University, 1996–2003
- Visiting professor, School of Computing, Napier University, Edinburgh, 2000–
- Visiting professor of Information Management, Napier University, Edinburgh, 1999–2000
- Doctor of Letters (Honoris Causa), Queen Margaret University College, Edinburgh, 1997
- Fellow, Royal Society of Arts, 1998
- Fellow, Institute of Management, 1989
- Fellow, Institute of Information Scientists, 1988
- Fellow, Library Association, 1984

== Publications ==
Blaise Cronin has written and edited more than 300 documents, including monographs, scientific articles, opinion papers, conference papers. Among his publications are:

- 1981: "The Need for a Theory of Citing." Journal of Documentation 37(1). https://doi.org/10.1108/eb026703
- 1984: The citation process. The role and significance of citations in scientific communication. London: Taylor Graham,
- 1988: Post-professionalism: transforming the information heartland. London: Taylor Graham (with Elizabeth Davenport).
- 1991: Elements of information management. Metuchen, NJ: Scarecrow Press (with Elizabeth Davenport).
- 1995: The scholar's courtesy: The role of acknowledgement in the primary communication process. London: Taylor Graham.
- 2000: The web of knowledge: A Festschrift in honor of Eugene Garfield. Medford, NJ: Information Today (with H.B. Atkins, Eds.).
- 2005: The Hand of Science: Academic Writing and its Rewards. Lanham, MD: Scarecrow Press.
- 2013: "Bias in Peer Review." Journal of the American Society for Information Science and Technology 64(1). DOI:10.1002/asi.22784 (with Carle J. Lee et al.).
- 2013: Bibliometrics: Global gender disparities in science. New York, NY: Macmillan Publishers Limited (Editor).
- 2014: Beyond Bibliometrics: Harnessing Multidimensional Indicators of Scholarly Impact. Cambridge, MA: MIT Press (with Cassidy R. Sugimoto).
- 2018: The sociological turn in information science. Cambridge, UK: Cambridge University Press (with Alan Gilchrist, Eds.).
