= B. (Bertram) C. Brookes =

British statistician and information scientist

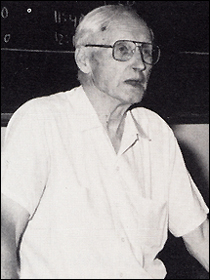
- Born: Bertram Claude Brookes; 7 February 1910
- Died: 10 June 1991 (aged 81)
- Citizenship: British
- Occupation: Information scientist / Lecturer
- Known for: Library and information science
- Awards: Derek John de Solla Price Award (1989)

Bertram Claude Brookes (7 February 1910 – 10 June 1991) was a British statistician and information scientist. He was best known for his research in informetrics, particularly for reformulating Bradford's Law for applications in academic library management and bibliometric studies. Brookes also made pioneering contributions to the philosophical foundations and methodologies of the emerging field of information science during the 1970s.

== Life ==
Brookes studied physics at Oxford University. After serving in the Royal Air Force and the Ministry of Supply during the Second World War, he joined University College London (UCL) in 1947. Until 1968, he was a lecturer in UCL's Department of Electrical Engineering.

From 1966 until his retirement from University College London in 1977, he was a professor at the School of Librarianship and Archives, now known as the Department of Information Studies. From 1964 to 1975 Brookes was a member of the editorial board of the Journal of Documentation, and he has been on the editorial board of the Journal of Information Science since 1982. He subsequently held visiting professorships at the University of Western Ontario and, from 1984 until his death in 1991, at City University London. Brookes died on 10 June 1991 at London.

== Research and teaching ==
=== Research on Bradford's law and bibliometrics ===
In 1968, Brookes published his first major work on the application of Bradford's law in libraries, followed by a Nature article in 1969 and a series of subsequent publications that spanned his career. Brookes's research on Bradford's law was not only a highlight of his career but also laid the foundation for a systematic study of bibliometric distributions, which continues to shape the field of bibliometrics today.

Bradford's law, first proposed by British mathematician and librarian Samuel C. Bradford in 1934, describes how scholarly articles on a given subject are distributed across journals. It observes that a small core of journals produces the majority of significant papers on a topic, while a much larger number of journals publish only a few relevant articles each. When Brookes began his research, the application of Bradford's law in library settings was limited. The calculations then required researchers to identify a large number of peripheral papers and perform complex computations—tasks that were time-consuming and discouraged practical use. As a result, the law had remained, in Brookes's words, a mere statistical curiosity.^{p. 175}

Brookes proposed that, with the emerging use of computer-based search systems, Bradford's law could be transformed into a practical tool for libraries. By focusing on the most productive journals, librarians could efficiently generate subject bibliographies and estimate the scope of literature within a given field. He also introduced a modified form of the Bradford distribution that combined its principles with those of the Zipf distribution, developed by linguist George Kingsley Zipf in the 1930s and 1940s. Zipf's distribution describes an inverse relationship between the frequency and rank of an item in naturally occurring datasets, such as word frequencies in language. By linking these two statistical models, Brookes streamlined the process of literature estimation and bibliographic generation, making Bradford's Law a practical instrument for information retrieval and library management.

=== The fundamental equation ===
Brookes is often associated with the cognitive turn in information science through his "fundamental equation", sometimes also known as "foundational equation", which models information as a change in a person’s knowledge structure: K[S] + ΔI = K[S + ΔS]. In this equation, information ( ΔI ) is defined as capable of modifying knowledge structure, which views information not only as something that is added to the mind, but also as a state of informativeness, the meaning of which varies by person and situation.

=== Development of library and information science pedagogy ===
Although Brookes's most frequently cited and widely remembered works concern his research on bibliometrics and the reformulation of Bradford's law, his teaching was also regarded as one of the pioneering efforts in the pedagogy of library and information science. Brookes's work as an educator, shaping the discipline's intellectual foundations and classroom practices during its formative decades between the 1950s and 1970s, was equally influential and remains what many of his students remember most vividly. After his appointment in 1947 as lecturer at University College London (UCL), Brookes taught courses in statistics for engineering and co-authored the textbook Introduction to Statistical Method with W. F. L. Dick, with various emended editions published between the 1950s and 1970s. The book was widely adopted in U.K. schools and was praised as a pioneering work in statistical education. Brookes was also among the earliest pioneers to incorporate statistical methods into the training of library and information management. As early as 1967, he taught a course introducing performance measurement and quantitative evaluation techniques for library management, and he also published extensively on the pedagogy of library and information science training.

== Recognition and legacy ==
In 1989, Brookes received the Derek John de Solla Price Memorial Award, presented jointly to him and Czechoslovak information scientist Jan Vlachý. The international award, established in 1984 in honor of information scientist Derek J. de Solla Price, recognizes outstanding contributions to the field of scientometrics and information science.

Brookes's work has been read internationally and translated into several languages. Throughout his career, he traveled widely, teaching and presenting papers at conferences and seminars across Europe and North America. At both City University of London and University College London, he taught students from around the world and became known for his rigorous yet inspiring teaching style and communication skills. He was highly regarded by colleagues and students alike, not only as a pioneering researcher, but also as a generous mentor and peer.

== List of selected works ==
=== Journal articles ===
1. B.C. Brookes, The measures of information retrieval effectiveness proposed by Swets, Journal of Documentation 24 (1968) 41–54. https://doi.org/10.1108/eb026442
2. B.C. Brookes, The derivation and application of the Bradford-Zipf distribution, Journal of Documentation 24 (1968) 247–265.https://doi.org/10.1108/eb026457
3. B.C. Brookes, Bradford's law and the bibliography of science, Nature 224 (1969) 953–956. https://doi.org/10.1038/224953a0
4. B.C. Brookes, Obsolescence of special library periodicals : sampling errors and utility contours. Journal of the American Society for Information Science 21 (1970) 320–329. https://doi.org/10.1002/asi.4630210503
5. B.C. Brookes, Optimum P% library of scientific periodicals. Nature 232 (1971) 458–461. https://doi.org/10.1038/232458a0
6. B.C. Brookes, The foundations of information science. Part I: philosophical aspects, Journal of Information Science 2 (1980) 125–133. https://doi.org/10.1177/016555158000200302
7. B.C. Brookes, The foundations of information science. Part II: quantitative aspects: classes of things and the challenge of human individuality. Journal of Information Science 2 (1980) 209–221. https://doi.org/10.1177/016555158000200502
8. B.C. Brookes, The foundations of information science. Part III: quantitative aspects: objective maps and subjective landscapes, Journal of Information Science 2 (1980)269-275. https://doi.org/10.1177/016555158000200602
9. B.C. Brookes, The foundations of information science. Part IV: information science: the changing paradigm, Journal of Information Science 3 (1981) 3–12. https://doi.org/10.1177/016555158100300102

=== Books and book chapters ===
1. B.C. Brookes and W.F.L. Dick, Introduction to Statistical Method (Heinemann, London, 1951).
2. B.C. Brookes, Notes on the Teaching of Statistics in Schools (Heinemann, London, 1952).
3. B.C. Brookes. Information science. In: H.A. Whatley (Editor), British Librarianship and Information Science 1966-1970 (Library Association, London, 1972)137-149.
