= Science-wide author databases of standardized citation indicators =

Ranking of the world scientist

The science-wide author databases of standardized citation indicators is a multidimensional ranking of the world's scientists produced since 2015 by a team of researchers led by John P. A. Ioannidis at Stanford.

== Main ==
Based on data from Scopus, this indicators explore about 8 million records of scientists' citations in order to rank a subset of 200,000 most-cited authors across all scientific fields. This is commonly referred to as Stanford ranking of the 2% best scientists.

The ranking is achieved via a composite indicator built on six citation metrics

- Total citations;
- Hirsch h-index;
- Coauthorship-adjusted Schreiber hm-index;
- The number of citations to papers as a single author;
- The number of citations to papers as single or first author;
- The number of citations to papers as single, first, or last author.

== Data ==
Data (about 200,000 records) are freely downloadable from Elsevier through the International Center for the Study of Research (ICSR) Lab.

== Output ==
The index classifies researchers into 22 scientific fields and 174 sub-fields. Different rankings are produced: career-long and most recent year, with and without self-citations. This results in four different configurations. The difference between this ranking (called as c-score) and the pure h-index is that it is sensitive to details of co-authorship and author positions: configurations such as single, first, and last author are given more emphasis. Many authors point to the importance of the index created by Ioannidis in the context of accurate, cheap and simple descriptions of research systems, Being listed in Stanford's Rank is treated as prestigious and translates into increased visibility of scientists, which may translate into increased networking potential and for obtaining research funding. Moreover, The rank offers an opportunity to researchers in a field to compare the citation behavior of their field with others.

== Reception and applications ==
The papers introducing the ranking have been quoted extensively by authors working in Bibliometrics and Scientometrics. For example, reference describing an update to the methodology of this index number is cited from authors publishing in journals such as SAGE's Research on Social Work Practice, Elsevier's Perspectives in Ecology and Conservation, Springer's Forensic Science, Medicine and Pathology, Oxford Academic's The Journals of Gerontology: Series A, and Springer's Scientometrics (journal).

The older methodological paper is quoted even more, from journal such as MIT Press's Quantitative Science Studies, Springer's Scientometrics and many others.

These articles variously point to the methodological papers and associated measure to discuss social aspects of the publication activity, such as unequal access to publishing of different social or national groups, including gender bias or the properties of the underlying Scopus' abstract and citation database. The database has been linked to data about Retraction in academic publishing to study the frequency of retractions among highly cited researchers. Frietsch et al. compare the Stanford ranking against the Clarivate's Highly Cited Researchers database, noting that while the latter captures only 10% of Nobel laureates, the former identifies over 90%.

Comparative analyses run on the database show the importance of excluding self-citation as done in the ranking. Another study praises the index over the simple Hirsch number but proposes a different accounting for authors who are neither first nor last in the ranking. The data base is not without errors, and is faulted by some for privileging US-based scholars, notably in legal studies.

Wil van der Aalst reviews some of the known shortcomings of scientific rankings, including subjectivity, Matthew effect, country bias, discipline bias, and the Leiden Manifesto for research metrics admonition that quantitative measures should only support expert assessment and should not replace informed judgment. This author notes that, at the same time, one should not resort to subjective evaluations of research productivity and impact while ignoring the data that are there, and thus praises the usefulness of the database, also as input for further analyses.

Kuc-Czarnecka and Saltelli analysed the composite indicator using global sensitivity analysis, arguing that correlation among its six components makes their effective weights differ from the declared ones; they proposed a modified measure based on fewer variables and benchmarked it against a Condorcet-type ranking. Commenting on that paper, Prathap argued that the composite indicator, as a sum of log-normalised size-dependent indicators, cannot separate the size of an author's output from its citation intensity, and that it depends on the highest values in the cohort.

The measure has been used to investigate systemic disparities in pharmacology and pharmacy research.

== See also ==
- Composite indicators
- Bibliometrics
- Scientometrics
