= Ronald Rousseau =

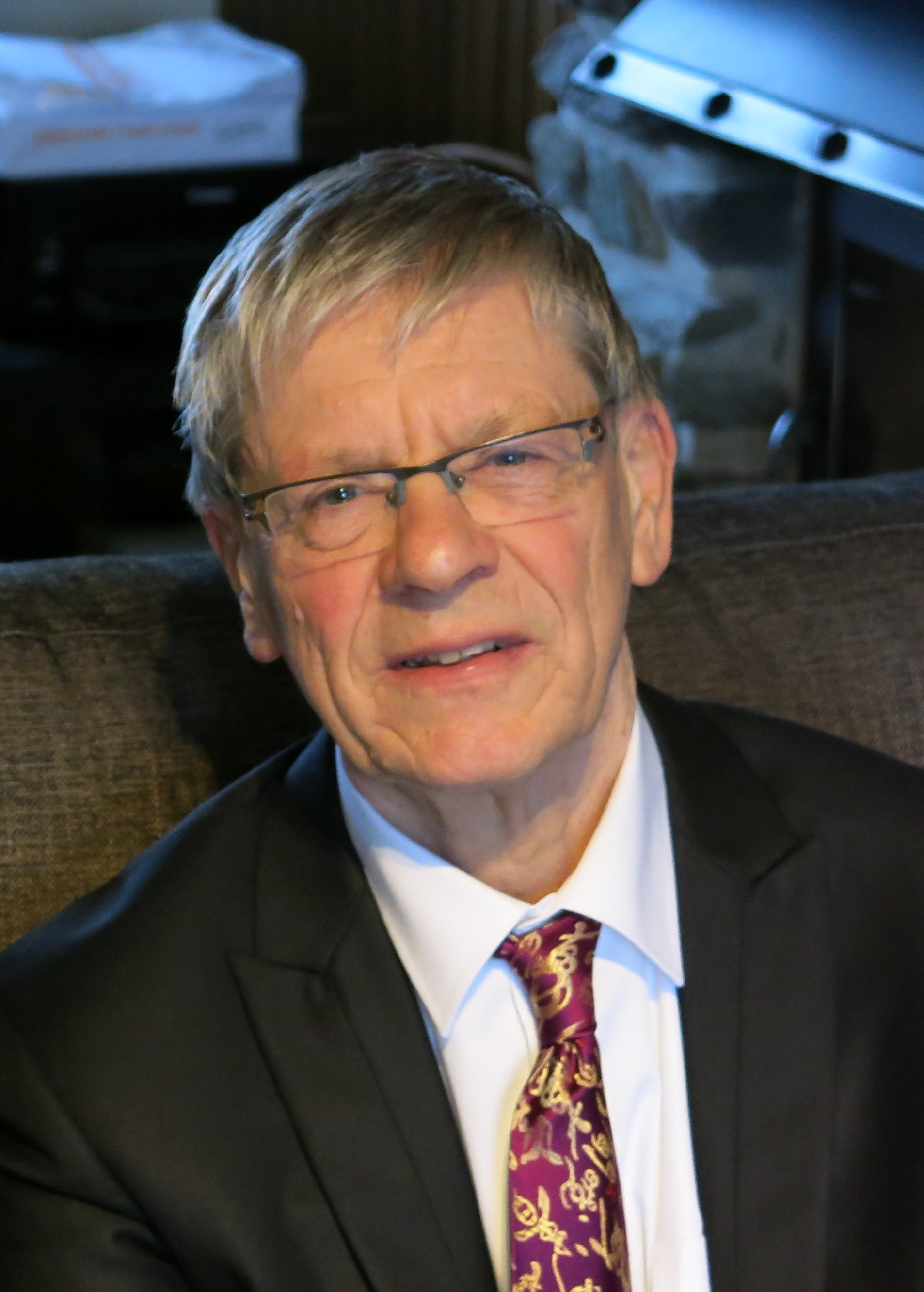
- Ronald Rousseau
- Born: Ronald Joseph Emile Rousseau; 14 August 1949; Antwerp (Belgium)
- Spouse: Myrian Salembier
- Awards: Derek J. de Solla Price Medal (2001)
- Scientific career
- Fields: Bibliometrics; Scientometrics; Mathematics
- Workplaces: KHBO; KU Leuven; University of Antwerp

Ronald Rousseau (born 1949 in Antwerp) is a Belgian mathematician and information scientist. He has obtained an international reputation for his research on indicators and citation analysis in the fields of bibliometrics and scientometrics.

== Education and career ==
Ronald Rousseau obtained his doctorate in mathematics at the KU Leuven in 1977 and his doctorate in documentation and library science at the UIA in 1992. He was Professor of Mathematics at the Department of Industrial Science and Technology at the KHBO in Ostend, Belgium. Rousseau has focused his research on the development and use of indicators to measure the quality of research and main trends in science. He is an expert in citation analysis and research evaluation. In 1990 Ronald Rousseau and Leo Egghe wrote the first manual of bibliometrics. Rousseau has published more than 200 scientific articles on various aspects of bibliometrics and scientometrics in, among other journals, Scientometrics, Journal of the American Society for Information Science and Technology, and the Journal of Informetrics. He is considered to be one of the most productive writers in this discipline. Rousseau, along with Leo Egghe, received the Derek de Solla Price award in 2001. From 2007 till 2015, he was the seventh chairperson of ISSI. In 2015 he became co-editor-in-chief of the Journal of Data and Information Science.

== Honors and awards ==
- For his mathematical work Ronald Rousseau was Laureate of the Royal Belgian Academy of Sciences and Arts, class Natural Sciences in 1979.
- Ronald Rousseau received the Derek de Solla Price award together with Leo Egghe in 2001.
- He is an Honorary professor at the Zhejiang University in Hangzhou, China (2015).
- He is an Honorary professor at the Henan Normal University in Xinxiang, China (2001).
- He is a guest professor at the National Library of Sciences of the Chinese Academy of Sciences in Beijing, China.
- He is a Fellow of the Institute of Scientometrics in Dharwad, India.
- He is a guest professor at the Library and Information Center, library of the CAS in Chengdu, China.
- He is a guest professor at Nanjing Agricultural University (NJAU) in Nanjing, China.
- He is an Honorary Professor of the University of Kent in Canterbury, UK.
- Ronald Rousseau received the 2020 West Lake Friendship Award from Zhejiang Province, China.
- In 2021, he received the President's International Fellowship Inititative (PIFI) award as Distinguished Scientist from the Chinese Academy of Sciences.

== Publications (selection) ==
Books

- Egghe, L., & Rousseau, R. (1990). Introduction to informetrics. Quantitative methods in library, documentation and information science. ISBN 0-444-88493-9. Elsevier, 430 p.
- Ding, Y., Rousseau, R., & Wolfram, D. (eds.) (2014). Measuring scholarly impact: Methods and practice. ISBN 978-3-319-10377-8. Cham, Switzerland: Springer.
- Rousseau, R., Egghe, L. & Guns, R. (2018). Becoming metric-wise. A bibliometric guide for researchers, ISBN 978-0-08-102474-4. Chandos Publishing: Elsevier

Articles

- Rousseau, R. (1979). Sitations: An exploratory study. Cybermetrics, 1(1) [The first article showing that Internet inlinks follow a power law]
- Rousseau, S., & Rousseau, R. (1997). Data envelopment analysis as a tool for constructing scientometric indicators. Scientometrics, 40(1), 45–56. doi:10.1007/BF02459261
- Otte, E., & Rousseau, R. (2002). Social network analysis: a powerful strategy, also for the information sciences. Journal of Information Science, 28(6), 441–453. doi:10.1177/016555150202800601
- Ahlgren, P., Jarneving, B., & Rousseau, R. (2003). Requirements for a cocitation similarity measure, with special reference to Pearson's correlation coefficient. Journal of the American Society for Information Science and Technology, 54(6), 550–560. doi:10.1002/asi.10242
- Egghe, L., & Rousseau, R. (2006). An informetric model for the Hirsch-index. Scientometrics, 69(1), 121–129. doi:10.1007/s11192-006-0143-8
- Jin, B., Liang, L., Rousseau, R., & Egghe, L. (2007). The R-and AR-indices: Complementing the h-index. Chinese Science Bulletin, 52(6), 855–863. doi:10.1007/s11434-007-0145-9
