= Wolfgang Glänzel =

German statistician

Wolfgang Joachim Emil Glänzel (born April 13, 1955) is a German statistician who is professor emeritus at KU Leuven, where he is also the director of the Centre for R&D Monitoring. In 1999, he and Henk Moed received the Derek de Solla Price Memorial Medal from the International Society for Scientometrics and Informetrics (ISSI). Currently, he is the editor-in-chief of Scientometrics, as well as secretary-treasurer of the ISSI. In that role, he took the controversial decision to withdraw an article under pressure by a commercial publisher criticized in that paper and partly owned by the publisher of his journal.

Born in Frankfurt (Oder), then part of East Germany, Glänzel was educated at Eötvös Loránd University in Budapest and Leiden University.
