= Belver C. Griffith =

Belver C. Griffith (1931 – October 23, 1999) was an American information scientist and teacher. He is best known for his work in teaching information science. In 1981, Griffith, along with White created the co-citation of authors method.Griffith has his collection of work known as the Belver Griffith Papers. His was also known as the recipient of many awards that were related to psychology and information science.

== Education ==
Griffith earned his Bachelors Degree in psychology for the University of Virginia in 1951. His earned his Masters Degree, also in psychology from the University of Connecticut in 1953. His Doctorate was earned in 1957, in experimental psychology, was also from the University of Connecticut.

== Career ==
In 1961, he pursued the Information profession. Griffith was the associate director of the project on Scientific Information Exchange in Psychology of the American Psychological Association. Eventually, Griffith worked his way up to director in 1966. In 1969, he was appointed professor at Drexel University and became research professor and professor emertis in 1992. Griffith was one of the original innovators of the doctoral program and faculty leader at Drexel University's College of Information Science and Technology The works have been published in Japanese, Russian, Portuguese, Swedish, and Czech.

== Belver Griffith papers ==
The Belver Griffith papers are located at Drexel University in the Drexel University Archives. "The Belver Griffith papers shed much light on the acclaimed professor's scholarly activities from the 1960s until the late 1980s, including his work at Drexel University.The majority of the collection consists of Dr. Griffith's correspondence with collaborators and scholars studying scientific communication and information science, and date primarily from the 1970s and 1980s." It is arranged by awards, file name, and professional activities.

=== Co-citation of authors ===
Griffith, along with White, invented the co-citation of Authors technique. The co-citation of authors is when two authors from two different documents are cited in the same document, it tells the researcher that the two different authors have a similar mental base. White & Griffith (1981) explain:

The more two documents are cited together, the closer the relationship between them, are perceived by the citing authors, and the closer they would appear in the graphic rendering of groups of documents. Treating documents as points and their co-citation levels as the inverse of distance creates map (p.163).

In other words, if more documents have the two authors cited in other documents, or co-cited, the bigger the co-citation will be.

== Accomplishments and awards ==
=== Accomplishments ===
Griffith had more than 50 journal articles, technical reports, chapters, one edited book, and one research monograph

=== Awards ===
Award	Year
Derek J. deS. Price Medal for Scientometrics	1997
