= Kenneth Baillie =

British critical care physician

Professor J. Kenneth Baillie FRSE FMedSci FRCA FRCPE
- Known for: Genetic prediction of baricitinib as an effective therapy for Covid-19
- Awards: Prix Galien, Pride of Scotland

Academic background
- Education: University of Edinburgh

Academic work
- Discipline: Genomics, Computational Biology, Critical care
- Institutions: University of Edinburgh
- Website: www.research.ed.ac.uk/en/persons/kenneth-baillie

Kenneth Baillie FRSE FMedSci, is a British clinician-scientist and Professor of Experimental Medicine at the University of Edinburgh, working in genomics in critical care medicine. He practices as a consultant in critical care medicine at the Royal Infirmary of Edinburgh. Baillie has been a fellow of the Academy of Medical Sciences and the Royal Society of Edinburgh for his pioneering work discovering effective drug targets using human genetics.

== Career ==
Baillie studied medicine at the University of Edinburgh (BSc (Hons) in Physiology, 1999; MB ChB, 2002) and completed specialist training in anaesthesia and critical care. He was awarded a PhD from Edinburgh in 2012 for work in statistical genetics in infectious disease, and held Wellcome Trust clinical fellowships before appointment to his current chair in 2021.

== Research ==
=== Host Genomics and therapeutics ===
Baillie's research has been built on the prediction that the host genome can reveal therapeutically-actionable mechanisms of disease. He discovered multiple human genes important in critical illness caused by influenza and COVID-19. He started the GenISIS study in 2009, and the GenOMICC study in 2015, to examine genetic predisposition to severe infections. GenOMICC has now recruited over 44,000 criticall-ill patients, and claims to be the largest consented research study in the history of critical care medicine worldwide.

In 2020 Baillie found host genetic associations, including pathways involving TYK2, that revealed how the human immune system damages patients' lungs in severe Covid-19. Baillie predicted that a TYK2-inhibiting drug, baricitinib, would be an effective treatment. As a direct result of this, baricitinib was tested in the RECOVERY trial, and found to be effective.

=== High altitude research ===
In 2001, as an undergraduate, Baillie founded Apex (Altitude Physiology Expeditions), a high-altitude research charity, and led its first expedition to a high-altitude laboratory in Bolivia. The organisation continues to run research expeditions every few years and supported early-career clinicians entering academic medicine. Baillie's work on clinical subgrouping in acute mountain sickness contributed to a revised international consensus definition of the condition.

=== Clinical Characterisation Protocol ===
Baillie led a global consensus group and created the ISARIC/WHO Clinical Characterisation Protocol (CCP) in 2011 to eliminate delays in research set-up during disease outbreaks by sharing open-source infrastructure for outbreak research. The CCP has in use in many countries worldwide, and was used to the first characterisation report of novel coronavirus from Wuhan.

During the COVID-19 pandemic the protocol was activated across all UK hospitals under Baillie's joint leadership of ISARIC4C, the largest observational research study of hospitalised Covid-19 patients anywhere in the world. The UK protocol was later activated for the 2022 outbreak of unexplained acute hepatitis in children. In that outbreak, Baillie co-chaired the UK public health response group and co-led work identifying an infectious and genetic cause of the illness.

=== Computational biology ===
Baillie was a key contributor to the FANTOM5 international consortium, in which he used machine learning to partition co-expression signals at promoter resolution from 5′ RNA sequencing data, inferring the function of genes implicated in the host response to influenza. FANTOM5 remains foundational to the field of AI genomic language models as the most comprehensive and highest-resolution source of transcription initiation sites in the human genome.

While a visiting scientist at the Broad Institute in 2014–15, Baillie developed meta-analysis by information content (MAIC), a method that weights heterogeneous functional genomics datasets by quality and relevance to a biological process. MAIC has been applied to therapeutic target prioritisation in critical illness and other settings, and formed part of Baillie's synthesis of COVID-19 pathophysiology. It remains the most powerful gene list-integration method for real data from biological experiments.

== Guidelines and policy ==
Baillie has worked with the World Health Organization on influenza, MERS, Ebola and COVID-19. During the COVID-19 pandemic he advised the UK government through SAGE and related groups on clinical management of the outbreak.

== Awards and honours ==
Baillie is a fellow of the Academy of Medical Sciences (2023) and a Fellow of the Royal Society of Edinburgh (2022). He received the University of Edinburgh Chancellor's Award for Research (2023), honorary membership of the Intensive Care Society (2025), the Herald Heroes of the Year award (2020), and a Pride of Scotland special recognition award (2021). He has been listed among Clarivate Highly Cited Researchers.

== Selected publications ==
- Baillie, J. K. (2014). "Translational genomics. Targeting the host immune response to fight infection". Science. 344 (6186): 807–808. doi:10.1126/science.1255074. PMID 24855243.
- Forrest, A. R. R.; Kawaji, H.; Rehle, M.; Baillie, J. K.; et al. (2014). "A promoter-level mammalian expression atlas". Nature. 507: 462–470. doi:10.1038/nature13182. PMC 4529748.
- Pairo-Castineira, E.; Rawlik, K.; et al. (2023). "GWAS and meta-analysis identifies 49 genetic variants underlying critical COVID-19". Nature. 617: 764–768. doi:10.1038/s41586-023-06034-3. hdl:10481/84229.
