= Histcite =

HistCite is a software package used for bibliometric analysis and information visualization. It was developed by Eugene Garfield, the founder of the Institute for Scientific Information and the inventor of important information retrieval tools such as Current Contents and the Science Citation Index.
HistCite is no longer in active development or officially supported.

== Purpose ==
The main purpose of the software is to make it easier for individuals to perform bibliometric analysis and visualization tasks. Bibliometric analysis is the use of the bibliographic information (titles, authors, dates, author addresses, references, etc.) that describe published items to measure and otherwise study various aspects of a specific field of scholarly endeavor.

Some typical questions asked by bibliometricians that can be answered by HistCite analysis are:

1. How much literature has been published in this field? When and in what countries has it been published? What countries are the major contributors to this field? What are the languages most frequently used by the items published in this field?
2. What journals cover the literature of the field? Which are the most important?
3. Who are the key authors in this field? What institutions do these authors represent?
4. Which articles are the most important?
5. How have the various contributors to the field influenced each other?

The answers to such questions are valuable to researchers, librarians, and administrators.

Information visualization is the transformation of non-numerical data into a graphic format. Visualization helps various researchers and scholars understand large collections of information. Although there are numerous uses for information visualization, HistCite performs one specific application: it converts bibliographies into diagrams called historiographs.

A historiograph is a time-based network diagram of the papers in a bibliography and their citation relationships to each other. Historiographs are based on the citation relationships between the papers in a bibliography. In a historiograph, each paper in the bibliography is represented by a symbol selected by the user. The symbols are arranged over a timeline of the publication dates of the papers. By changing the time frame of the analysis, the resulting historiograph can form a snapshot of a specific period or an in-depth look at the total history of a subject. Once a historiograph is created for a bibliography, it is easier to see and understand the subject's key publication events, their chronology, and their relative influence.

== Applications ==
A wide variety of professionals who need to analyze the published literature use HistCite for analysis, for example: researchers, historians, journal editors, librarians and patent lawyers.

== Operation ==
In order to perform its functions, HistCite must import a bibliography from another source. Once the bibliography is imported, basic point-and-click commands initiate the various analyses and visualizations.

HistCite is currently set up to import bibliographies created by searches of the Web of Science database offered by Thomson-Reuters Scientific. Bibliographies from other sources can be manually entered into HistCite.

The bibliography the user feeds to HistCite represents the literature of the subject area as it is defined by that user's unique perspective. Thus, the analyses and visualizations produced by HistCite from that bibliography are one-of-a-kind.

HistCite operates on Windows computers with Internet Explorer.
