= Ranking =

Relationship between items in a set

A ranking is a relationship between a set of items, often recorded in a list, such that, for any two items, the first is either "ranked higher than", "ranked lower than", or "ranked equal to" the second. In mathematics, this is known as a weak order or total preorder of objects. It is not necessarily a total order of objects because two different objects can have the same ranking. The rankings themselves are totally ordered. For example, materials are totally preordered by hardness, while degrees of hardness are totally ordered. If two items are the same in rank it is considered a tie.

By reducing detailed measures to a sequence of ordinal numbers, rankings make it possible to evaluate complex information according to certain criteria. Thus, for example, an Internet search engine may rank the pages it finds according to an estimation of their relevance, making it possible for the user quickly to select the pages they are likely to want to see.

Analysis of data obtained by ranking commonly requires non-parametric statistics.

== Strategies for handling ties ==
It is not always possible to assign rankings uniquely. For example, in a race or competition two (or more) entrants might tie for a place in the ranking. When computing an ordinal measurement, two (or more) of the quantities being ranked might measure equal. In these cases, one of the strategies below for assigning the rankings may be adopted.

A common shorthand way to distinguish these ranking strategies is by the ranking numbers that would be produced for four items, with the first item ranked ahead of the second and third (which compare equal) which are both ranked ahead of the fourth. These names are also shown below.

=== Standard competition ranking ("1224" ranking) ===
In competition ranking, items that compare equal receive the same ranking number, and then a gap is left in the ranking numbers. The number of ranking numbers that are left out in this gap is one less than the number of items that compared equal. Equivalently, each item's ranking number is 1 plus the number of items ranked above it. This ranking strategy is frequently adopted for competitions, as it means that if two (or more) competitors tie for a position in the ranking, the position of all those ranked below them is unaffected (i.e., a competitor only comes second if exactly one person scores better than them, third if exactly two people score better than them, fourth if exactly three people score better than them, etc.).

Thus if A ranks ahead of B and C (which compare equal) which are both ranked ahead of D, then A gets ranking number 1 ("first"), B gets ranking number 2 ("joint second"), C also gets ranking number 2 ("joint second") and D gets ranking number 4 ("fourth").

This method is called "Low" by IBM SPSS and "min" by the R programming language in their methods to handle ties.

=== Modified competition ranking ("1334" ranking) ===
Sometimes, competition ranking is done by leaving the gaps in the ranking numbers before the sets of equal-ranking items (rather than after them as in standard competition ranking). The number of ranking numbers that are left out in this gap remains one less than the number of items that compared equal. Equivalently, each item's ranking number is equal to the number of items ranked equal to it or above it. This ranking ensures that a competitor only comes second if they score higher than all but one of their opponents, third if they score higher than all but two of their opponents, etc.

Thus if A ranks ahead of B and C (which compare equal) which are both ranked ahead of D, then A gets ranking number 1 ("first"), B gets ranking number 3 ("joint third"), C also gets ranking number 3 ("joint third") and D gets ranking number 4 ("fourth"). In this case, nobody would get ranking number 2 ("second") and that would be left as a gap.

This method is called "High" by IBM SPSS and "max" by the R programming language in their methods to handle ties.

=== Dense ranking ("1223" ranking) ===
In dense ranking, items that compare equally receive the same ranking number, and the next items receive the immediately following ranking number. Equivalently, each item's ranking number is 1 plus the number of items ranked above it that are distinct with respect to the ranking order.

Thus if A ranks ahead of B and C (which compare equal) which are both ranked ahead of D, then A gets ranking number 1 ("first"), B gets ranking number 2 ("joint second"), C also gets ranking number 2 ("joint second") and D gets ranking number 3 ("Third").

This method is called "Sequential" by IBM SPSS and "dense" by the R programming language in their methods to handle ties.

=== Ordinal ranking ("1234" ranking) ===
In ordinal ranking, all items receive distinct ordinal numbers, including items that compare equal. The assignment of distinct ordinal numbers to items that compare equal can be done at random, or arbitrarily, but it is generally preferable to use a system that is arbitrary but consistent, as this gives stable results if the ranking is done multiple times. An example of an arbitrary but consistent system would be to incorporate other attributes into the ranking order (such as alphabetical ordering of the competitor's name) to ensure that no two items exactly match.

With this strategy, if A ranks ahead of B and C (which compare equal) which are both ranked ahead of D, then A gets ranking number 1 ("first") and D gets ranking number 4 ("fourth"), and either B gets ranking number 2 ("second") and C gets ranking number 3 ("third") or C gets ranking number 2 ("second") and B gets ranking number 3 ("third").

In computer data processing, ordinal ranking is also referred to as "row numbering".

This method corresponds to the "first", "last", and "random" methods in the R programming language to handle ties.

=== Fractional ranking ("1 2.5 2.5 4" ranking) ===
Items that compare equal receive the same ranking number, which is the mean of what they would have under ordinal rankings; equivalently, the ranking number of 1 plus the number of items ranked above it plus half the number of items equal to it. This strategy has the property that the sum of the ranking numbers is the same as under ordinal ranking. For this reason, it is used in computing Borda counts and in statistical tests (see below).

Thus if A ranks ahead of B and C (which compare equal) which are both ranked ahead of D, then A gets ranking number 1 ("first"), B and C each get ranking number 2.5 (average of "joint second/third") and D gets ranking number 4 ("fourth").

Here is an example: Suppose you have the data set 1.0, 1.0, 2.0, 3.0, 3.0, 4.0, 5.0, 5.0, 5.0.

The ordinal ranks are 1, 2, 3, 4, 5, 6, 7, 8, 9.

For v = 1.0, the fractional rank is the average of the ordinal ranks: (1 + 2) / 2 = 1.5. In a similar manner, for v = 5.0, the fractional rank is (7 + 8 + 9) / 3 = 8.0.

Thus the fractional ranks are: 1.5, 1.5, 3.0, 4.5, 4.5, 6.0, 8.0, 8.0, 8.0

This method is called "Mean" by IBM SPSS and "average" by the R programming language in their methods to handle ties.

== Statistics ==
In statistics, ranking is the data transformation in which numerical or ordinal values are replaced by their rank when the data are sorted.

For example, the ranks of the numerical data 3.4, 5.1, 2.6, 7.3 are 2, 3, 1, 4.

As another example, the ordinal data hot, cold, warm would be replaced by 3, 1, 2. In these examples, the ranks are assigned to values in ascending order, although descending ranks can also be used.

Ranks are related to the indexed list of order statistics, which consists of the original dataset rearranged into ascending order.

== Sports ==
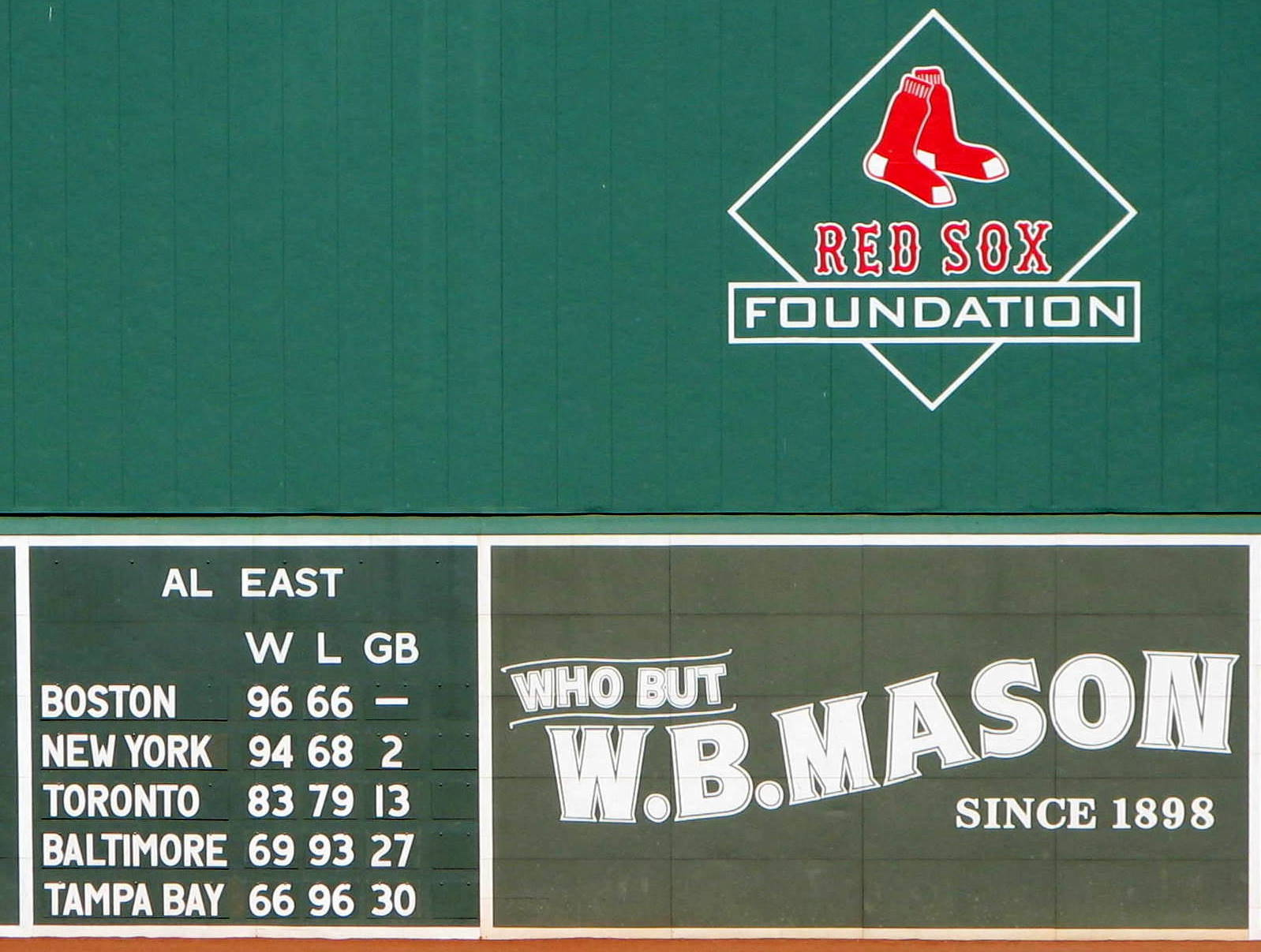
A partial view of the Green Monster at Fenway Park, with standings for the American League East division at the end of the 2007 Major League Baseball season

In sports, standings, rankings, or league tables group teams of a particular league, conference, or division in a chart based on how well each is doing in a particular season of a sports league or competition. These lists are generally published in newspapers and other media, as well as the official web sites of the sports leagues and competitions.

== Education ==
League tables are used to compare the academic achievements of different institutions. College and university rankings order institutions in higher education by combinations of factors. In addition to entire institutions, specific programs, departments, and schools are ranked. These rankings usually are conducted by magazines, newspapers, governments and academics. For example, league tables of British universities are published annually by The Independent, The Sunday Times, and The Times. The primary aim of these rankings is to inform potential applicants about British universities based on a range of criteria. Similarly, in countries like India, league tables are being developed and a popular magazine, Education World, published them based on data from TheLearningPoint.net.

It is complained that the ranking of England's schools to rigid guidelines that fail to take into account wider social conditions actually makes failing schools even worse. This is because the most involved parents will then avoid such schools, leaving only the children of non-ambitious parents to attend.

== Business ==
In business, league tables list the leaders in the business activity within a specific industry, ranking companies based on different criteria including revenue, earnings, and other relevant key performance indicators (such as market share and meeting customer expectations) enabling people to quickly analyze significant data.

== Applications ==
The rank methodology based on some specific indices is one of the most common systems used by policy makers and international organizations in order to assess the socio-economic context of the countries. Some notable examples include the Human Development Index (United Nations), Doing Business Index (World Bank), Corruption Perceptions Index (Transparency International), and Index of Economic Freedom (the Heritage Foundation). For instance, the Doing Business Indicator of the World Bank measures business regulations and their enforcement in 190 countries. Countries are ranked according to ten indicators that are synthesized to produce the final rank. Each indicator is composed of sub-indicators; for instance, the Registering Property Indicator is composed of four sub-indicators measuring time, procedures, costs, and quality of the land registration system. These kinds of ranks are based on subjective criteria for assigning the score. Sometimes, the adopted parameters may produce discrepancies with the empirical observations, therefore potential biases and paradox may emerge from the application of these criteria.

== Other examples ==
- In politics, rankings may focus on the comparison of economic, social, environmental and governance performance of countries. Politicians themselves have also been ranked, based on the extent of their activities.
- In relation to credit standing, the ranking of a security refers to where that particular security would stand in a wind up of the issuing company, i.e., its seniority in the company's capital structure. For instance, capital notes are subordinated securities; they would rank behind senior debt in a wind up. In other words, the holders of senior debt would be paid out before subordinated debt holders received any funds.
- Search engines rank web pages by their expected relevance to a user's query using a combination of query-dependent and query-independent methods. Query-independent methods attempt to measure the estimated importance of a page, independent of any consideration of how well it matches the specific query. Query-independent ranking is usually based on link analysis; examples include the HITS algorithm, PageRank and TrustRank. Query-dependent methods attempt to measure the degree to which a page matches a specific query, independent of the importance of the page. Query-dependent ranking is usually based on heuristics that consider the number and locations of matches of the various query words on the page itself, in the URL or in any anchor text referring to the page.
- In webometrics, it is possible to rank institutions according to their presence in the web (number of webpages) and the impact of these contents, such as the Webometrics Ranking of World Universities.
- In video gaming, players may be given a ranking. To "rank up" is to achieve a higher ranking relative to other players, especially with strategies that do not depend on the player's skill.
- The TrueSkill ranking system is a skill based ranking system for Xbox Live developed at Microsoft Research.
- A bibliogram ranks common noun phrases in a piece of text.
- In language, the status of an item (usually through what is known as "downranking" or "rank-shifting") in relation to the uppermost rank in a clause; for example, in the sentence "I want to eat the cake you made today", "eat" is on the uppermost rank, but "made" is downranked as part of the nominal group "the cake you made today"; this nominal group behaves as though it were a single noun (i.e., I want to eat it), and thus the verb within it ("made") is ranked differently from "eat".
- Academic journals are sometimes ranked according to impact factor; the number of later articles that cite articles in a given journal.

== See also ==
- Ordinal data
- Percentile rank
- Rating (disambiguation)
- Recommender system
