= Marko Petrič =

Slovenian academician, university professor, and wood scientist

- Petrič in 2026
- Born: September 18, 1962 (age 64); Ljubljana, Slovenia
- Education: University of Ljubljana
- Occupations: Researcher; educator; wood scientist
- Years active: Since 1992
- Known for: Studies on wood protection
- Awards: IAWS Fellowship (2018), Jesenko Lifetime Achievement Award (2025)
- Scientific career
- Workplaces: University of Ljubljana
- Thesis: Synthesis, characterisation and biological activity of copper carboxylates of higher fatty acids and their derivatives (1994)
- Doctoral advisor: Franc Pohleven

Marko Petrič (Ljubljana, 18 September 1962) is a Slovenian academician, wood scientist and professor at the University of Ljubljana, where he is a member of the Department of Wood Science and Technology at the Biotechnical Faculty.

He is an elected fellow (FIAWS) of The International Academy of Wood Science.

== Research career ==
He studied chemistry at the University of Ljubljana, where he received his undergraduate and master's degrees and completed a PhD in chemistry in 1994. He joined the University of Ljubljana's Biotechnical Faculty in 1990 and has worked in the field of wood science and technology since then. He became a professor in the field of wood processing and treatment technologies in 2008.

The research work of Petrič has focused on the surface properties and treatments of wood, concentrating of the protection of wood. He has led several national and international research projects. He has also been involved in the International Research Group on Wood Protection (IRG/WP), and served as head of Section 3, which deals with the wood protection chemicals.

In 2018, he received the University of Ljubljana's Golden Plaque for his research and teaching achievements in wood science. In October 2023, he was ranked at the top 2% of scientists in the world in the area of wood science ("forestry – polymers"). He got the same high rankings in 2025 and 2026.

In 2025, he received the Jesenko Lifetime Achievement Award from the Biotechnical Faculty of the University of Ljubljana, recognizing his achievements in teaching, research and professional activity.

Until October 2026, the research work of Marko Petrič has received 2,500 citations at Scopus, and more than 3,200 citations at Google Scholar.

== Selected publications ==
- Petrič, M. (2013). Surface Modification of Wood. Reviews of Adhesion and Adhesives.
