= Informetrics =

Study of the quantitative aspects of information

Informetrics is the study of quantitative aspects of information, it is an extension and evolution of traditional bibliometrics and scientometrics. Informetrics uses bibliometrics and scientometrics methods to study mainly the problems of literature information management and evaluation of science and technology.

Informetrics is an independent discipline that uses quantitative methods from mathematics and statistics to study the process, phenomena, and law of informetrics. Informetrics has gained more attention as it is a common scientific method for academic evaluation, research hotspots in discipline, and trend analysis.

Informetrics includes the production, dissemination, and use of all forms of information, regardless of its form or origin. Informetrics encompasses the following fields:

- Scientometrics, which studies quantitative aspects of science
- Webometrics, which studies quantitative aspects of the World Wide Web
- Bibliometrics, which studies quantitative aspects of recorded information
- The relationship between the metrics terms
  Cybermetrics, which is similar to webometrics, but broadens its definition to include electronic resources

== Origin and Development ==
The term informetrics (French: informétrie) was coined by German scholar Otto Nacke in 1979, and came from the German word 'informetrie’. The corresponding English terminology soon appeared in the subsequent literature.

In September 1980, Professor Otto Nacke introduced the term 'informetrics' at the first seminar on Informetrics in Frankfurt, Germany. Later, Committee on Informetrics has established through The International Federation for Information and Documentation (FID).

In 1987, informetrics started to be officially recognized by the international information community and several foreign information scientists.

In 1988, at First International Conference on Bibliometrics and Theoretical Aspects of Information Retrieval, Brooks suggested bibliometrics and scientometrics can be included in the field of informetrics.

In 1990, Leo Egghe and Ronald Rousseau proposed the formation of the discipline of informetrics: statistical bibliography (1923) to bibliometrics and scientometrics (1969) and then to informetrics (1979).

In 1993, the International Society for Scientometrics and Informetrics (ISSI) was founded at the International Conference on Bibliometrics, Informetrics and Scientometrics in Berlin, and the first one was held in Belgium and organized by Leo Egghe and Ronald Rousseau. The society was formally incorporated in 1994 in the Netherlands and plays a significant role in the development of informetrics.

The ISSI aims to promote the "exchange and communication of professional information in the fields of scientometrics and informetrics, including improve standards, theory and practice, as well as promote research, education and training". In addition, to "engage in relevant public conversation and policy discussions".

In the western world, 20th century's Informetrics is mostly based on Lotka's law, named after Alfred J. Lotka, Zipf's law, named after George Kingsley Zipf, Bradford's law named after Samuel C. Bradford and on the work of Derek J. de Solla Price, Gerard Salton, Leo Egghe, Ronald Rousseau, Tibor Braun, Olle Persson, Peter Ingwersen, Manfred Bonitz, and Eugene Garfield.

== Difference Between Informetrics, Bibliometrics and Scientometrics ==
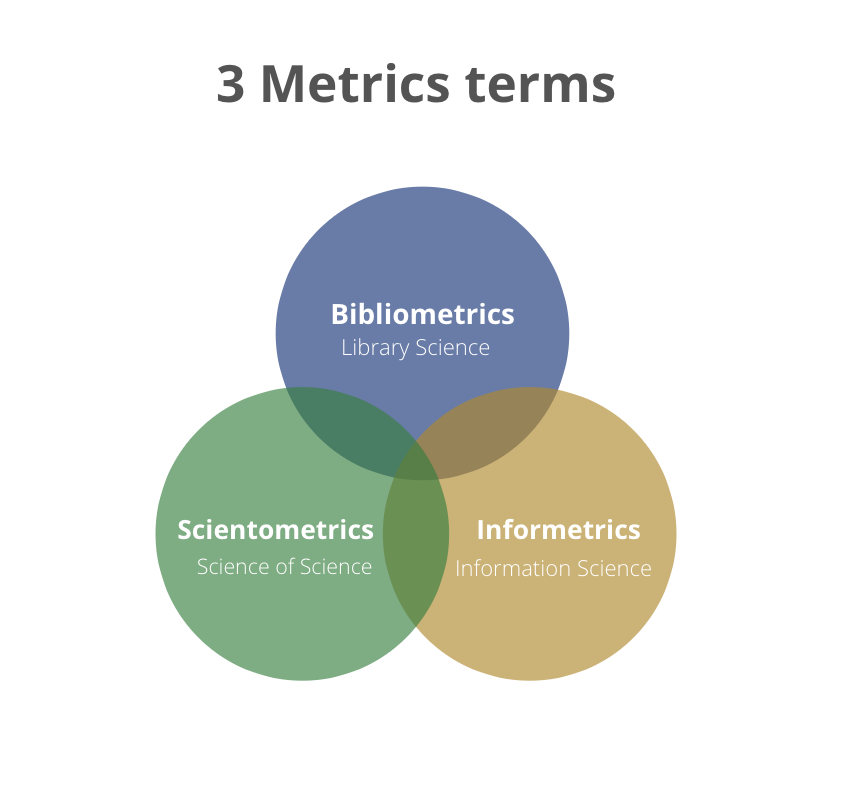
Three metrics terms overlap with each other

Since the 1960s, three similar terms have emerged in the fields of library science, philology and science of science, they are bibliometrics, scientometrics and informetrics, representing three very similar quantitative sub-disciplines. The three metrics terms can be confusing and often misused. Informetrics and bibliometrics interpenetrate each other but have different aspects in research object, research scope, and measuring unit. Informetrics and scientometrics are very different in their research purpose and research object, as well as the research scope and application.

Bibliometrics is categorised under the field of library science, it uses mathematical and statistical methods to describe, evaluate, and predict the current status and trends of science and technology. Also to study the "distribution structure, quantitative relationship, change law and quantitative management of literature information, quantitative relationships, patterns and quantitative management of literature and information". The term was first used by Alan Pritchard in 1969 in his paper Statistical Bibliography or Bibliometrics?.

Scientometrics is a branch of science that quantitatively evaluates and predicts the process and management of scientific activities in order to reveal their development patterns and trends. The definition of scientometrics was described by Derek De Solla Price in his book Science to Science as the “quantitative study of science, communication in science, and science policy”.

=== Links between the three metrics terms ===
The most prominent connection between the three metrics terms is in their research objects. Since all three disciplines use literature information as their research object, therefore, they have some similarities and overlaps in their research methods and fields. Moreover, they all use mathematical methods as the basic research methods and they all apply the three basic laws, Bradford's law, Lotka's law and Zipf's law.

=== Distinctions between the three metrics terms ===
The distinction between the three metrics terms can tell from their research object and research purpose. The research of bibliometrics focuses on the analysis of "scientific output in the form of articles, publications, citations, and others". Scientometrics is to measure the basic characteristics and laws of scientific activities. Where informetrics is to investigate information sources and information distribution process.

== Concept and System Structure ==
=== Purpose of Informetrics Research ===
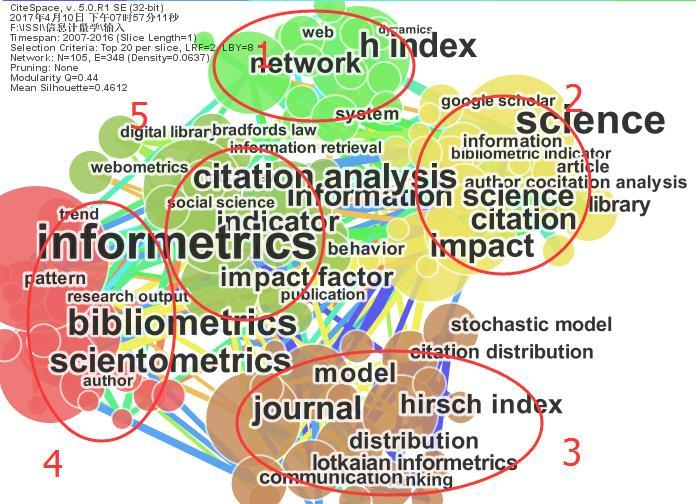
Subject structure of informetrics

The main purpose of informetrics is to use its theocratical research to solve the methodological issues in the research process, and to discover and reveal the basic laws of information distribution through the study of information process and phenomenon. In this way, makes information management more scientific and provides a quantitative basis for information services and information management decisions.

For informetrics, it is necessary to bring quantitative analysis methods to further reveal the structure of information units and the "quantitative change law of literature information”. Further to this, to improve the scientific accuracy of information science from a theoretical point of view. At the same time, to better solve the basic contradictions in the information service, overcome the information crisis, and make the information management work more effective to serve science and technology, economic and social development.

Quantitative analysis of bibliographic data was pioneered by Robert K. Merton in an article called Science, Technology, and Society in Seventeenth Century England and originally published by Merton in 1938.

=== The Significance of Informetrics Research ===
The significance of informetrics research is to summarize various empirical laws from the theoretical point of view, at the same time test and modify the various empirical laws in the new information unit conditions, and explore its new applicability, therefore, the scientific nature of information science can be improved, but also to provide theoretical guidance for practical work.

=== The Objects of Informetrics Research ===
The object of informetrics is broader than the field of bibliometrics and scientometrics, including "messages, data, events, objects, text, and documents”. Informetrics is often used to inform policies and decisions across a broad range of fields, such as economy, politics, technology and social spheres that "influence the flow and use patterns of information". Tague-Sutcliffe describes the following uses of informetrics:

- Citation analysis;
- Characteristics of authors;
- Use of recorded information;
- Obsolescence of the literature;
- Concomitant growth of new concepts;
- Characteristics of publication sources;
- Definition and measurement o information;
- Growth of subject literature, databases, libraries;
- Types and characteristics of retrieval performance measures;
- Statistical aspects of language, word, and phrase frequencies.

== Basic Laws ==
Informetrics draws on several empirical regularities identified in the early 20th century. Three commonly cited examples are Bradford's law, Lotka's law, and Zipf's law, which describe statistical patterns in scientific literature, scientific productivity, and word frequency, respectively.

=== Bradford's Law ===
The British documentalist and librarian Samuel C. Bradford first discovered the law of concentration and scattering of literature, and in 1934, it has been described as Bradford's law of scattering. It reveals the law of concentration and scattering of scientific papers in journals in a quantitative way, which is the most basic law and an important part of bibliometrics, as well as informetrics and its research still has important irreplaceable theoretical value and practical significance. Bradford found a pattern in the distribution of disciplinary literature among journals, papers from one discipline often appear in journals of another discipline. Eventually, there is a pattern for a large number of papers in a given discipline to be concentrated in a certain number of journals, while the others are scattered in a large number of other related journals. He ranked journals by the number of papers published in a particular discipline, "in their descending order of productivity", then can dividing articles into three different zones, first is the nuclear zone with high productivity; "the second zone moderately productive zone; and the third as the low productive zone". In summary, Bradford's law described the relationship between the number of journals and papers.

=== Lotka's Law ===
Lotka's law is an empirical law describing the productivity of science, also known as the inverse square law, pioneered by the American statistician Alfred J. Lotka in 1926. It reveals scientific productivity and the quantitative relationship between authors and papers. Lotka's law is mainly used to predict the number of authors and papers in a specific discipline, to grasp the trend of the growth of literature, thus, facilitating scientific management of literature information.

=== Zipf's Law ===
Zipf's law is proposed by linguist George Kingsley Zipf in 1949, it is obtained from the statistics of natural language vocabulary. It is a summary of the "literature vocabulary frequency distribution rule". The frequency of different words has a certain statistical regularity. Zipf's law has significant use in the fields of library information, information resources management, science and technology management.

== Informetrics Education in Library and Information Science (LIS) ==
Informetrics study is usually offered to undergraduate and post-graduate students. Only a few universities offer informetrics as an independent course, such as China, Germany and Japan. Most Universities include informetrics in the department of library and information science.

In fact, many challenges and the need for improvements have been shown in informetrics education across the world. Constant examination and adjustment in Informetrics education are needed as the rapid evolvement of information technologies in the field of LIS, for example, the emergence of webometrics/cybermetrics. On the other hand, technological development has become a challenge that affects the learning environment of informetrics education, for example, the shortage of research expertise in the informetrics field, and the insufficient skills of research specialists and data collection tools. Moreover, most countries have limited resources in informetrics education, as some Universities only offer the course if there is a demand among students.

Although many countries do not offer informetrics education, it is still important and necessary to maintain and continue further development in the field of informetrics as it is useful in science policy and management, as well as plays an essential role in the domain of research evaluation. Informetrics education can provide an in-depth understanding of "information user communities and the boundaries of specific fields". As science and technology are continuously innovating and developing, using the methods and applications of informetrics allows for "research monitoring and evaluation purpose in an objective way". Moreover, informetrics research is benefited almost all scientific fields, as it is multidisciplinary.

== Development ==
With the advent of digitalization and the development of technologies, virtual libraries and online journals have become the main way for researchers and scholars to access scientific literature information, which has made the measurement and evaluation of web-based literature information more important. Webometrics/cybermetrics is the expansion of informetrics and bibliometrics, that has theoretical significance and broad application prospects. Network and information are the relationships of inheritance and development, hence, webometrics/cybermetrics as a new sub-discipline under the field of informetrics has rapidly developed to adapt to the network environment.

Webometrics/cybermetrics is a discipline in science that integrates bibliometrics, informetrics, statistical methods, and computer technology to measure and analyze information and documents on the web, which covers "quantitative aspects of both the construction side and the usage side of the Web". The concept of webometrics was introduced in 1997 by T.C. Almind and P. Ingwersen and became a research hotspot in 1999. In 2000, scientists began to explore the disciplinary system and theoretical framework of webometrics and conducted meaningful application research. Its research areas include link analysis, search engines and web citation analysis.

== See also ==
- Burden of knowledge
- Content analysis
- Data mining
- Diplomatics
- Journal of Informetrics
- Library collection development
