= Ernest Lancaster-Jones =

British museum curator and librarian (1891–1945)

Ernest Lancaster-Jones (8 November, 1891, Radcliffe, Greater Manchester–1945) was a curator at the Science Museum, London. He was Keeper of Physics at the museum in 1923 and developed a taxonomy for the museum's acoustics collection using five sections: the production, control, recording and measurement of sound, as well as how acoustics were applied in science, technology and industry. In 1935 he succeeded Samuel C. Bradford as Keeper of the Science Library.
