= Size–frequency distribution =

Statistical tool

A Size–frequency distribution is a statistical tool used to describe the size distribution of a population of organisms or particles. It is often used in biology, geology, and other fields to study the size and distribution of organisms or particles within a population.

The size of an organism or particle is typically measured using a physical characteristic such as length, width, or mass. The size–frequency distribution is then plotted on a graph, with the size of the organisms or particles on the x-axis and the frequency of occurrence on the y-axis. This results in a curve that represents the distribution of sizes within the population.

Size–frequency distributions can be used to study a variety of phenomena, including the growth and development of organisms, the impacts of environmental factors on population size, and the distribution of sediment particles in a particular environment. They can also be used to study the distribution of particles in industrial processes, such as the size distribution of particles in a fluidized bed or the size distribution of particles in a powder mixture.

There are several different types of size–frequency distributions, including the normal distribution, the log-normal distribution, and the skewed distribution. The type of distribution observed can provide insight into the processes that have shaped the size distribution of the population.

Size–frequency distributions are an important tool for understanding the dynamics of populations and for making predictions about the impacts of environmental and other factors on population size and distribution. They are used in a wide range of fields, including biology, geology, and engineering, to study the size and distribution of organisms, particles, and other objects.

== Examples ==
In a study of the growth and development of fish, size–frequency distribution can be used to understand how the size of individual fish changes over time and how this is influenced by environmental factors such as temperature and food availability. In a study of sedimentary rocks, size–frequency distribution can be used to understand the distribution of particles within the rock and the processes that shaped the rock formations. In a study of industrial processes, size–frequency distribution can be used to understand the size distribution of particles in a fluidized bed or a powder mixture, which can help optimize the efficiency of the process.

=== Growth and development of fish ===
Size–frequency distribution can be used to study the growth and development of fish in a population. By measuring the size of individual fish at different ages or stages of development and plotting the size–frequency distribution, researchers can understand how the size of fish changes over time and how this is influenced by environmental factors. For example, a study might compare the size–frequency distribution of a fish population in a lake with a high food availability to a fish population in a lake with a low food availability. The size–frequency distribution of the fish in the lake with a high food availability may show faster growth and larger sizes, while the size–frequency distribution of the fish in the lake with a low food availability may show slower growth and smaller sizes.

=== Sedimentary rocks ===
Size–frequency distribution is often used in geology to study the distribution of particles within sedimentary rocks. By analyzing the size–frequency distribution of particles in a rock, researchers can gain insights into the processes that shaped the rock formations. For example, a study might compare the size–frequency distribution of particles in a sandstone rock with the size–frequency distribution of particles in a shale rock. The size–frequency distribution of the sandstone rock may show a wider range of particle sizes and a more uniform distribution, indicating that the rock was formed through processes such as wind or water erosion. In contrast, the size–frequency distribution of the shale rock may show a narrower range of particle sizes and a less uniform distribution, indicating that the rock was formed through processes such as sedimentation and compaction.

=== Industrial processes ===
Size–frequency distribution is also used in engineering to study the size distribution of particles in industrial processes. For example, in a fluidized bed process, the size–frequency distribution of the particles can be used to optimize the efficiency of the process. By understanding the size distribution of the particles, engineers can adjust the operating conditions of the process to ensure that the particles are evenly distributed and that they are being efficiently transported through the bed. Similarly, in a powder mixture process, the size–frequency distribution of the particles can be used to optimize the consistency and performance of the mixture. By understanding the size distribution of the particles, engineers can adjust the mixture ratios and processing conditions to ensure that the mixture has the desired properties.

== Size–frequency distribution and statistical analysis ==
Size–frequency distribution is often used in conjunction with other statistical analysis techniques to gain a more comprehensive understanding of population dynamics. For example, researchers may use regression analysis to understand the relationship between size and other variables, such as age or sex, or may use multivariate analysis to understand the relationship between size and multiple variables simultaneously. By combining size–frequency distribution with these other statistical tools, researchers can gain a more complete understanding of the factors that shape the size and distribution of a population.

Additionally, statistical tests, such as the Kolmogorov–Smirnov test or the chi-squared test, can be used to compare the size–frequency distribution of two or more populations and determine whether there are statistically significant differences between the distributions. This can be useful for identifying differences between populations that may be influenced by environmental or other factors.

Overall, the use of size–frequency distribution in conjunction with statistical analysis techniques can provide a powerful tool for understanding population dynamics and making informed decisions about the management and conservation of populations.

== See also ==
- Bibliographic coupling
- Bibliogram
