= Article-level metrics =

Measurements designed to measure scholarly article impact

Article-level metrics are citation metrics which measure the usage and impact of individual scholarly articles. The most common article-level citation metric is the number of citations. Field-weighted Citation Impact (FWCI) by Scopus divides the total citations by the average number of citations for an article in the scientific field.

Alternative article-level metrics include the CD index, a measure of the disruptiveness of an article.

== Adoption ==
Traditionally, bibliometrics have been used to evaluate the usage and impact of research, but have usually been focused on journal-level metrics such as the impact factor or researcher-level metrics such as the h-index. Article-level metrics, on the other hand, may demonstrate the impact of an individual article. This is related to, but distinct from, altmetrics.

Starting in March 2009, the Public Library of Science introduced article-level metrics for all articles. The open access publisher PLOS provides article level metrics for all of its journals including downloads, citations, and altmetrics. In March 2014 it was announced that COUNTER statistics, which measure usage of online scholarly resources, are now available at the article level.

== See also ==
- Bibliometrics
- Scientometrics
