= STAR METRICS =

US government research project

STAR METRICS (Science and Technology for America's Reinvestment: Measuring the EffecT of Research on Innovation, Competitiveness and Science) was a partnership (STAR METRICS Consortium) between United States federal science agencies and research institutions to document the return on investment, research impact, and social outcomes of federally funded research and development. The federal consortium comprised the White House Office of Science and Technology Policy (OSTP), the National Institutes of Health (NIH), the National Science Foundation, (NSF), the US Department of Agriculture, (USDA), and the US Environmental Protection Agency,(EPA). NIH was the host agency for the consortium, which was governed by an Executive Committee and an advisory interagency working group.

It was announced by OSTP on 28 May 2010 in a press release titled "STAR METRICS: New Way to Measure the Impact of Federally Funded Research".

== Pilot ==
A pilot was undertaken by the following seven institutions in a Federal Demonstration Partnership:

- University of Texas at Austin
- University of Delaware
- George Mason University
- California Institute of Technology
- University of Alabama
- University of Massachusetts, Dartmouth

== History ==
The imperative for the launch of STAR METRICS was the passing of the American Recovery and Reinvestment Act of 2009 (ARRA), which included a stimulus package for research and development because it was widely believed that investments in science and research would stimulate economic growth. Part of the bill required recipients to report quarterly on job creation. The ARRA reporting requirements are distinct from STAR METRICS. The latter was established to provide evidence that investment in research had a positive effect on the economy, because there is little thoroughly conclusive evidence that this is actually the case - even though it is a generally accepted assumption.

In 2010 STAR METRICS was given a five-year commitment from agencies, and NIH and NSF committed $1 million (~$1.36 million in 2023) combined. Other federal funders that have joined are the United States Department of Energy, Environmental Protection Agency, and Department of Agriculture. Research institutions voluntarily join the consortium. Subsequent funding from federal agencies continued until 2022.

The formal governance was put in place in January 2012, with NIH hosting the project.

The goal of the program was set to develop measures for the impact of federal investments on science, society, the workforce and the economy. To this end, a database was set up of all federally funded researchers and cleaned to ensure no confusions of people with the same or similar names etc. were made. This database was then used to match with other accessible databases such as public records of patents, institutional financial records, payroll data, as well as more traditional scientific output indicators such as scientific citations.

== Outcomes ==
An attraction of STAR METRICS project was that it would scrape data from existing reports, databases, and the internet for the information it needed, much like the Lattes Platform in Brazil.

STAR METRICS quickly started tracking job creation from ARRA and non-ARRA research grants at 70 universities, and subsequently moved on to tracking other outcomes of investment in research.

STAR METRICS also developed Federal RePORTER, a database that consolidated information from several extant databases--eRA databases, Medline, and PubMed Central -- using linkages among these disparate data sources. This centralized database allowed for research into science funding across federal agencies and linkages to subsequent downstream impacts and outcomes. The database was discontinued on March 1, 2022, but served as the inspiration for other efforts to track and link federal science investments to outcomes, such as the University of Michigan's Institute for Research On Innovation and Science (IRIS) program. The following agencies contributed data to Federal RePORTER:

- DOD (Department of Defense)
- Center for Neuroscience and Regenerative Medicine (CNRM)
- Congressionally Directed Medical Research Programs (CDMRP)
- Combat Care Casualty Research Program (CCCRP)
- Defense and Veterans Brain Injury Center (DVBIC)
- ED (Department of Education)
- Institute of Education Sciences (IES)
- Environmental Protection Agency (EPA)
- HHS (Department of Health and Human Services)
- Administration for Children and Families (ACF)
- Agency for Healthcare Research and Quality (AHRQ)
- Centers for Disease Control and Prevention (CDC)
- Food and Drug Administration (FDA)
- National Institute on Disability, Independent Living, and Rehabilitation Research (NIDILRR)
- National Institutes of Health (NIH)
- National Aeronautics and Space Administration (NASA)
- National Science Foundation (NSF)
- USDA (United States Department of Agriculture)
- Agriculture Research Service (ARS)
- Forest Service (FS)
- National Institute of Food and Agriculture (NIFA)
- U.S. Department of Veterans Affairs (VA)

== See also ==
- Comparison of Research Networking Tools and Research Profiling Systems
