= Institute for Scientific Information =

Academic publishing service

The Institute for Scientific Information (ISI) was an academic publishing service, founded by Eugene Garfield in Philadelphia in 1956. ISI offered scientometric and bibliographic database services. Its specialty was citation indexing and analysis, a field pioneered by Garfield.

== Services ==
ISI maintained citation databases covering thousands of academic journals, including a continuation of its longtime print-based indexing service the Science Citation Index (SCI), as well as the Social Sciences Citation Index (SSCI) and the Arts and Humanities Citation Index (AHCI). All of these were available via ISI's Web of Knowledge database service. This database allows a researcher to identify which articles have been cited most frequently, and who has cited them. The database provides some measure of the academic impact of the papers indexed in it, and may increase their impact by making them more visible and providing them with a quality label. Some anecdotal evidence suggests that appearing in this database can double the number of citations received by a given paper. The company's main product was Current Contents, which gathers the tables of contents for recent academic journals. For several years this also included Citation Classics, personal commentaries on highly cited papers.

The ISI also published the annual Journal Citation Reports which list an impact factor for each of the journals that it tracked. Within the scientific community, journal impact factors continue to play a large but controversial role in determining the kudos attached to a scientist's published research record.

A list of over 14,000 journals was maintained by the ISI. The list included some 1,100 arts and humanities journals as well as scientific journals. Listings were based on published selection criteria and are an indicator of journal quality and impact.

ISI published Science Watch, a newsletter which every two months identified one paper published in the previous two years as a "fast-breaking paper" in each of 22 broad fields of science, such as Mathematics (including Statistics), Engineering, Biology, Chemistry, and Physics. The designations were based on the number of citations and the largest increase from one bimonthly update to the next. Articles about the papers often included comments by the authors.

The ISI also published a list of "ISI Highly Cited Researchers", one of the factors included in the Academic Ranking of World Universities published by Shanghai Jiao Tong University. This continues under Clarivate.

== History ==
Initially, the company was named Documation. In 1992, ISI was acquired by Thomson Scientific & Healthcare, and became known as Thomson ISI. It was a part of the Intellectual Property & Science business of Thomson Reuters until 2016, when the IP & Science business was sold, becoming Clarivate Analytics. Clarivate has since established ISI as part of its Scientific and Academic Research group.

== ISI Highly Cited ==
"ISI Highly Cited" is a database of "highly cited researchers"—scientific researchers whose publications are most often cited in academic journals over the past decade, published by the Institute for Scientific Information. Inclusion in this list is taken as a measure of the esteem of these academics and is used, for example, by the Academic Ranking of World Universities. It was founded under ISI and as of 2018 continues under the same name at Clarivate.

The methodology for inclusion is to consider papers in the upper first percentile based on citation counts of all articles indexed in the Scientific Citation Databases and published in a single, fixed year. Papers in the upper first percentile with respect to their year of publication are called highly cited papers. Each paper in the data is assigned to one or more of 21 categories, based on the ISI classification of the journal in which the article was published. The Highly Cited Researchers list is compiled by selecting, in every field, those researchers with the highest number of highly cited papers in a 10-year, rolling time period. The number of highly cited researchers varies from field to field and is determined accordingly to the total number of researchers contributing to the single field.

The categories are:

- Agricultural Sciences
- Biology & Biochemistry
- Chemistry
- Clinical Medicine
- Computer Science
- Ecology/Environment
- Economics/Business
- Engineering
- Geosciences
- Immunology
- Materials Science
- Mathematics
- Microbiology
- Molecular Biology & Genetics
- Neuroscience
- Pharmacology
- Physics
- Plant & Animal Science
- Psychology/Psychiatry
- Social Sciences – General
- Space Sciences

The publication list and biographical details supplied by the researchers are freely available online, although general access to the ISI citation database is by subscription.

== See also ==
- Clarivate Citation Laureates
