= Journal of Informetrics =

- Discipline: Informetrics, scientometrics
- Language: English
- Edited by: Leo Egghe

Publication details
- History: 2007–present
- Publisher: Elsevier
- Frequency: Quarterly
- Open access: no
- Impact factor: 4.153 (2012)

Standard abbreviations
- ISO 4: J. Informetr.

Indexing
- ISSN: 1751-1577
- LCCN: 2007209325
- OCLC no.: 605171371

Links
- Journal homepage; Online access

The Journal of Informetrics is a closed-access quarterly peer-reviewed academic journal covering research on scientometrics and informetrics. It was established in 2007 by Leo Egghe. The journal is published by Elsevier.

The editor-in-chief was Ludo Waltman (CWTS, Leiden University), until early 2019 when the full editorial board stepped down and founded the rival open-access journal Quantitative Science Studies.
