= Vasily Nalimov =

Russian philosopher (1910–1997)

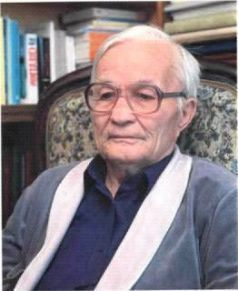
Vasiliy Vasilievich Nalimov

Vasiliy Vasilievich Nalimov (Васи́лий Васи́льевич Нали́мов; 4 November 1910, Moscow – 19 January 1997) was a Russian philosopher and humanist and wrote on Transpersonal Psychology. His main areas of research were the philosophy of probability and its biological, mathematical, and linguistic manifestations. He also studied the roles of gnosticism and mysticism in science. Thompson (1993) summarizes Nalimov as: "...philosopher, educator, devoted husband, mathematician, dissident, writer, and (although he may deny it) visionary".

Nalimov has a reputation as a founder of the area of Scientometrics, as he coined the Russian term "Naukometriya" in 1969, together with Zinaida Maksimovna Mulchenko. He was not proposing the concept of citation index, as sometimes claimed. That idea reaches much further back (1873) and was first professionally used in the area of law to look up related cases Shepard's Citations. It was introduced on a large scale for science first by Eugene Garfield.

Nalimov's father, Vasily Petrovich, obtained a formal medical degree in Moscow, was an anthropologist and ethnographer and was considered a shaman by his community. Nalimov's mother, Nadezhda Ivanovna, was among the first group of women to graduate as physicians in Russia.

Nalimov was a co-worker of the mathematician Andrey Kolmogorov. Rustum Roy held Nalimov in high regard and sponsored some of his works.
