= Highly Cited Researchers =

List of researchers noted for academic citations

Highly Cited Researchers is a list published annually by Clarivate of academic authors who in the past eleven years have authored multiple highly cited publications in academic journals indexed by Web of Science. This list includes approximately 0.1% of the total worldwide number of scientific researchers.

== History ==
The list has been published yearly since 2001.

In 2016, Clarivate sent a congratulatory email to many researchers who had not actually received the designation. It was not disclosed how many researchers the congratulations were erroneously sent to.

Over 1,000 researchers were excluded from the 2023 list in total, largely for unethical citation practices and other examples of poor academic integrity. Specifically, researchers affiliated with Saudi Arabian universities saw a sharp decline from the previous years' rankings in 2023. In April 2023, El País revealed that Saudi universities had been paying researchers to add their institution as an affiliation. After correction, the number of HCRs affiliated with Saudi institutions dropped by 30%. Following the incident, Clarivate released a statement supporting integrity in researcher affiliations.

For the first time in eight years, 2025 saw the US win back some of its share from China. After dropping 7% from 2018–2024, the share of US-affiliated researchers increased 1% in 2025. This trend reversal was attributed by Clarivate primarily to adjustments to its methodology designed to exclude extremely prolific authorship.

=== Trend analysis ===
The percentage of HCRs affiliated with institutions from mainland China was only 0.1% in 2001, but by 2016 it had risen to 3.5%, reflecting the increased spending on research conducted by Chinese colleges and universities, though during this time, the number of affiliations specifically to the Chinese Academy of Sciences decreased. The rate of Chinese HCRs continued to increase each year until 2024, at which point 20% of all HCRs were affiliated with a Chinese institution.

The percentage of US-affiliated HCRs reached a low of 37% in 2024; it has been steadily declining since 2018, at which time 43% of all HCRs were affiliated with a US institution.

The proportion of women in the HCR list has been studied, with results suggesting that research by women receives less citations, as they represented only 16% of the researchers on the list. Research has also shown that in the fields of chemistry, computer science, engineering, mathematics, and physics and astronomy, where the biggest disparity occurs, women constitute 4–7% of the HCRs although they make up over 25% of authors in the field. (For further information, see: Women in STEM fields and Sexism in academia)

== Methodology ==
As of their 2022 list, Clarivate uses "performance statistics" from data in the Web of Science. There are 21 specific fields, and one for interdisciplinary science—Clarivate creates a list of papers that are in the top 1% most highly cited in their field, (Note: Excluding retracted papers and those with more than 30 authors and/or explicit group authorship.) and admission to the HCR list is based on an author's number of papers in the top 1%.

The resulting list of highly cited researchers can be manipulated by citation cartels. After it was found that obscure researchers had displaced eminent mathematicians in the list, Clarivate had to remove the whole field of mathematics from the list in 2023. The mathematics category was reintroduced in 2025 after Clarivate revised its methodology to better filter out hyper-prolific researchers whose citations exaggerate their influence.

== Prestige ==
Many institutions in the US post a press release, blog post, or news story upon a faculty member being recognized in the program. (Note: See, for example: University of California; Harvard University; Scripps Research; St. Jude Children's Research Hospital; University of Washington)

== Usage ==
The list of HCRs has been used to create a specific list of authoritative researchers; one study specifically used HCRs to show trends of retractions in Iran.

As of 2019, the list is also used as a factor in determining the rank of a college in the Academic Ranking of World Universities, which uses the number of affiliated HCRs in its ranking criteria.

== See also ==
- Science-wide author databases of standardized citation indicators
