= Documentalist =

Type of librarian specializing in documentation science

A documentalist is a professional, trained in documentation science and specializing in assisting researchers in their search for scientific and technical documentation. With the development of bibliographical databases such as MEDLINE, documentalists were professionals who searched such databases on the behalf of users.

When the field of documentation changed its name to information science, the terms information specialist or information professional often replaced the term documentalist.

== See also ==
- Archivist
- Information scientist
- Information professional
- Librarian
- Library and information science

== Literature ==
- Bowles, M. D. (1999). The information wars: Two cultures and the conflict in information retrieval, 1945-1999. In: M. E. Bowden, T. B. Hahn, & R. V. Williams (eds.), Proceedings of the 1998 Conference on the History and Heritage of Science Information Systems. (pp. 156–166). Medford, NJ: Information Today, Inc. for the American Society for Information Science and the Chemical Heritage Foundation.
- Bradford, S. C. (1953). Documentation. 2nd ed. With an introd. by Jesse H. Shera and Margaret E. Egan. London: Crosby Lockwood.
- Meadows, A. J. (1990). "Theory in Information Science". Journal of Information Science, 16, 59–63.
- Olsson, L. (1991). "Bibliotekarieyrkets framtidida status". In: Enmark, E. (ed.). Biblioteken och framtiden. Göteborg: Centrum för bibliotekforskning.
- Olsson, L. (1992). "I&D och profession - en fråga om teknik? Bidrag til 8:de Nordiska IoD", Helsingborg 19-21 maj, 1992. 10 sider.
- Shera, J. (1960). School of Library Science Annual Report (1960–61). Cleveland, OH: Western Reserve University.
- Williams, R. V. (1998). "The Documentation and Special Libraries Movement in the United States, 1910–1960". In: Hahn, T. B. & Buckland, M. (eds.): Historical Studies in Information Science. Medford, NJ: Information Today, Inc. (pp. 173–180).
