= Burden of knowledge =

Concept of knowledge being a burden

The burden of knowledge describes the difficulty of adding to a scientific field as the amount of previous work that must be understood increases over time. This is seen across scientific disciplines. Evidence for this burden includes a trend that people are older before they receive their first patent or publish in a prestigious journal, and the need for scientific groups to be larger as scientists need to collaborate so that the team has sufficient understanding of prior work.

== Scholarship ==
Explicit scholarship of this idea has entered the mainstream with the works of Benjamin Jones, in particular The Burden of Knowledge and the Death of the Renaissance Man, and with the works of Jan Brendel and Sascha Schweitzer The Burden of Knowledge in Mathematics.

== Overview ==
Theory and empirical studies reflect the case that researchers and innovators are not born with the required expertise and must first undertake education. With accumulating information and discoveries, the time to digest and improve on extant knowledge takes longer. Similarly, frontiers of knowledge advance at an overall increasing rate and are shifting over time. The "burden of knowledge" refers to the difficulty of catching up with this evolving knowledge frontier.

A hard metric used by Brendel and Schweitzer for mathematics burden is age at first publication. They specifically point to "a significant increase of the average age of researchers at their first publication in one of our top-ranking journals."

Findings associated with Burden of Knowledge investigations point to declining productivity in sole researchers and developers and increasing productivity by teams. Prominent examples of highly effective team research in basic science include those of Nobel Prize awardees Francis Crick and James Watson's work on DNA structure, Yang Chen-Ning and Tsung-Dao Lee's work on parity violation, and Katalin Karikó and Drew Weissman's mRNA vaccine discoveries and development.

Research also point to better outcomes in gender diverse teams. Interestingly, research points to better development by large teams and more R&D novelty and disruption by small teams.

== Challenges in other areas ==
Challenges due to increasing complexity and data are found in other fields. There are observed productivity challenges in pharmaceutical drug discovery R&D. The challenges also manifest in an overall trend of patents, papers, and discoveries being less disruptive.

== Other uses of the phrase "Burden of knowledge" ==
Christian Turner (Professor of Law) uses the term "burden of knowledge" in a different way, referring to situations where one may be better off not knowing things, for example avoiding painful and uncomfortable details of one's health.
