= Webometrics =

Science of measuring the World Wide Web

The science of webometrics (also referred to as cybermetrics) aims to quantify the World Wide Web to get knowledge about the number and types of hyperlinks, the structure of the World Wide Web, and using patterns. According to Björneborn and Ingwersen, the definition of webometrics is "the study of the quantitative aspects of the construction and use of information resources, structures and technologies on the Web drawing on bibliometric and informetric approaches." The term webometrics was coined by Almind and Ingwersen (1997). A second definition of webometrics has also been introduced, "the study of web-based content with primarily quantitative methods for social science research goals using techniques that are not specific to one field of study", which emphasizes the development of applied methods for use in the wider social sciences. The purpose of this alternative definition was to help publicize appropriate methods outside the information-science discipline rather than to replace the original definition within information science.

Similar scientific fields are: bibliometrics, informetrics, scientometrics, virtual ethnography, and web mining.

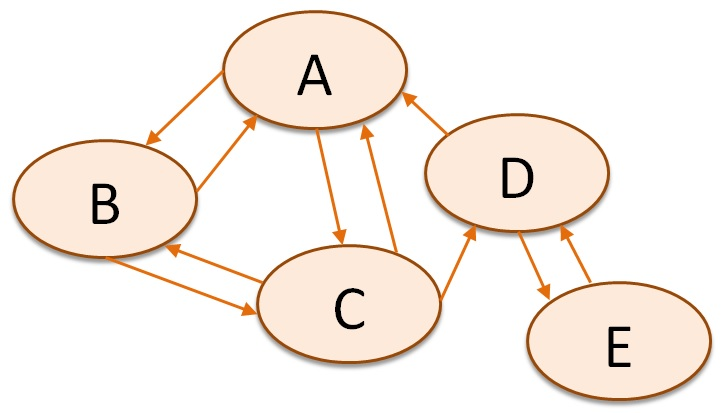
Site based graph relationship. The idea was taken from paper "Web-communicator creation costs sharing problem as a cooperative game".

One relatively straightforward measure is the "web impact factor" (WIF) introduced by Ingwersen (1998). The WIF measure may be defined as the number of web pages in a web site receiving links from other web sites, divided by the number of web pages published in the site that are accessible to the crawler. However, the use of WIF has been disregarded due to the mathematical artifacts derived from power law distributions of these variables. Other similar indicators using size of the institution instead of number of webpages have been proved more useful.

== See also ==
- Altmetrics
- Impact factor
- PageRank
- Network mapping
- Search engine
- Webometrics Ranking of World Universities

== Bibliography ==
- Tomas C. Almind & Peter Ingwersen (1997). "Informetric analyses on the World Wide Web: Methodological approaches to 'webometrics'". Journal of Documentation. 53 (4): 404–426. doi:10.1108/EUM0000000007205.
- Björneborn, Lennart & Ingwersen, Peter (2004). "Toward a basic framework for webometrics". Journal of the American Society for Information Science and Technology. 55 (14): 1216–1227. doi:10.1002/asi.20077.
- Peter Ingwersen (1998). "The calculation of web impact factors". Journal of Documentation. 54 (2): 236–243. doi:10.1108/EUM0000000007167. S2CID 27849021.
- Mike Thelwall; Liwen Vaughan; Lennart Björneborn (2005). "Webometrics". Annual Review of Information Science and Technology. 39: 81–135. doi:10.1002/aris.1440390110.
- Thelwall, Mike (2009). Introduction to Webometrics: Quantitative Web Research for the Social Sciences. Synthesis Lectures on Information Concepts, Retrieval, and Services. Vol. 1. Morgan & Claypool. pp. 1–116. doi:10.2200/S00176ED1V01Y200903ICR004. ISBN 978-1-59829-993-9. S2CID 25489497.
- Mazalov, Vladimir; Pechnikov, Andrey; Chirkov, Alexandr; Chuyko, Julia (2010). "Web-communicator creation costs sharing problem as a cooperative game (in Russian)" (PDF). Управление большими системами: сборник трудов.
- Ingwersen, Peter (2006). "Webometrics: ten years of expansion".
