= Academic Ranking of World Universities =

Global university ranking

- Categories: Higher education
- Frequency: Annual
- Publisher: 2009; 17 years ago: Shanghai Ranking Consultancy; 2003–2008: Shanghai Jiao Tong University
- Founded: 2003; 23 years ago
- Country: China
- Language: Chinese and English
- Website: shanghairanking.com

Academic Ranking of World Universities
- Simplified Chinese: 世界大学学术排名
- Traditional Chinese: 世界大學學術排名
Transcriptions
Standard Mandarin
- Hanyu Pinyin: Shìjiè Dàxué Xuéshù Páimíng

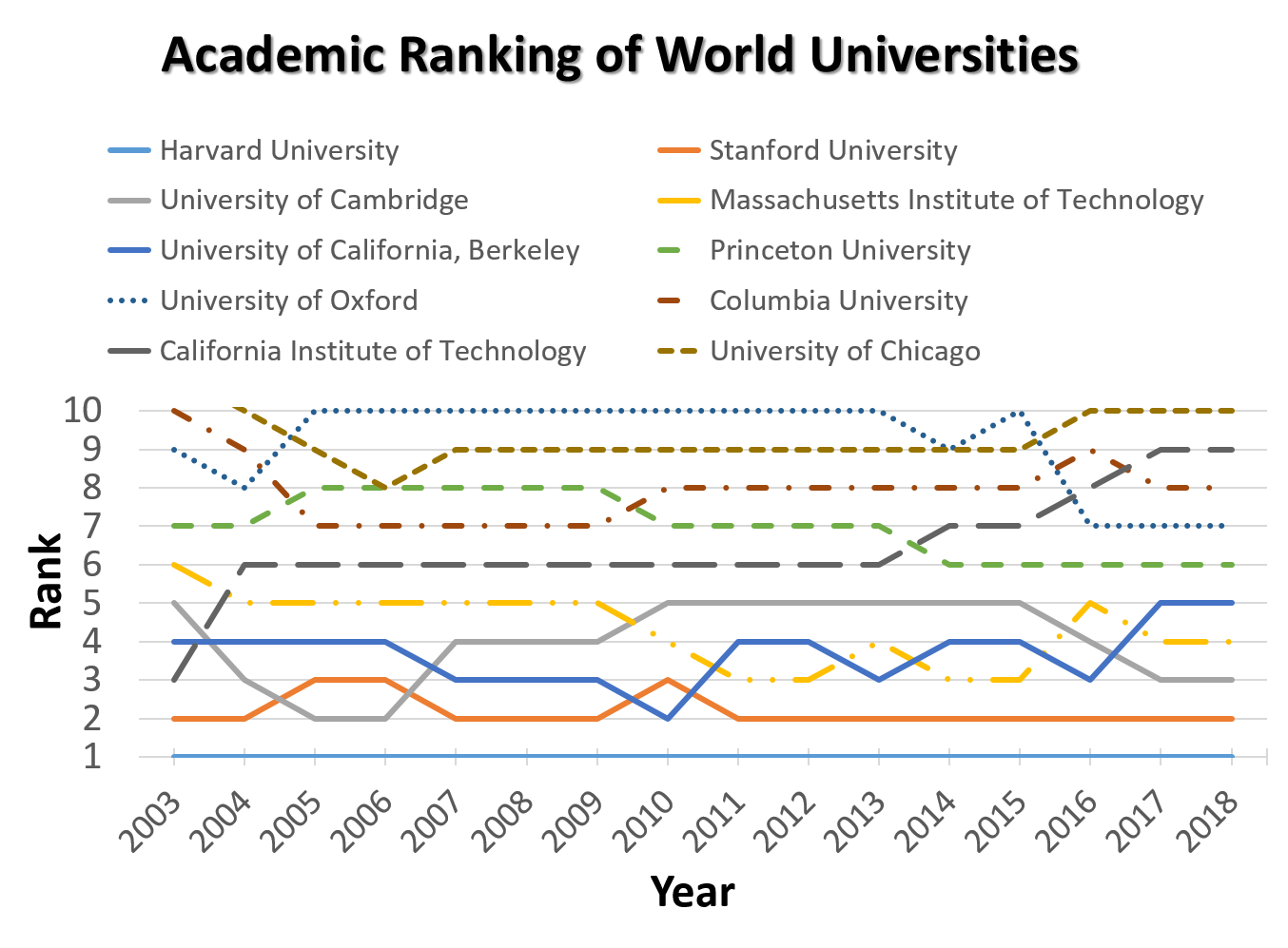
Academic Ranking of World Universities, 2003–2018, top ten

The Academic Ranking of World Universities (ARWU), also known as the Shanghai Ranking, is one of the annual publications of world university rankings. The league table was originally compiled and issued by Shanghai Jiao Tong University in 2003, making it the first global university ranking with multifarious indicators.

Since 2009, ARWU has been published and copyrighted annually by Shanghai Ranking Consultancy, an organization focusing on higher education that is not legally subordinated to any universities or government agencies. In 2011, a board of international advisory consisting of scholars and policy researchers was established to provide suggestions. The publication currently includes global league tables for institutions as a whole and for a selection of individual subjects, alongside independent regional Greater China Ranking and Macedonian HEIs Ranking.

ARWU is regarded as one of the three most influential and widely observed university rankings, alongside QS World University Rankings and Times Higher Education World University Rankings. It has received positive feedback for its objectivity and methodology, but draws wide criticism as it fails to adjust for the size of the institution, and thus larger institutions tend to rank above smaller ones.

== Global rankings ==
=== Overall ===
==== Methodology ====
ARWU methodology
Criterion	Indicator	Code	Weighting	Source
Quality of education	Alumni as Nobel laureates & Fields Medalists	Alumni	10%	Official websites of Nobel Laureates & Fields Medalists (Note: Official datum sources adopted by ARWU: Nobel Laureate Web, Fields Medalist Web, Thomson Reuters' survey of highly cited researchers & Thomson Reuters' Web of Science.)
Quality of faculty	Staff as Nobel Laureates & Fields Medalists	Award	20%	Official websites of Nobel Laureates & Fields Medalists
Quality of faculty	Highly cited researchers in 21 broad subject categories	HiCi	20%	Thomson Reuters' survey of highly cited researchers
Research output	Papers published in Nature and Science (Note: Not applicable to institutions specialized in humanities and social sciences whose N&S scores are relocated to other indicators.)	N&S	20%	Citation index
Research output	Papers indexed in Science Citation Index-expanded and Social Science Citation Index	PUB	20%	Citation index
Per capita performance	Per capita academic performance of an institution	PCP	10%	–

==== Reception ====
EU Research Headlines reported the ARWU's work on 31 December 2003: "The universities were carefully evaluated using several indicators of research performance." A survey on higher education published by The Economist in 2005 commented ARWU as "the most widely used annual ranking of the world's research universities." In 2010, The Chronicle of Higher Education called ARWU "the best-known and most influential global ranking of universities" and Philip G. Altbach named ARWU's 'consistency, clarity of purpose, and transparency' as significant strengths. University of Oxford Chancellor Chris Patten has said "the methodology looks fairly solid ... it looks like a pretty good stab at a fair comparison." While ARWU has originated in China, the ranking have been praised for being unbiased towards Asian institutions, especially Chinese institutions.

==== Criticism ====
The ranking has been criticised for "relying too much on award factors" thus undermining the importance of quality of instruction and humanities. A 2007 paper published in the journal Scientometrics found that the results from the Shanghai rankings could not be reproduced from raw data using the method described by Liu and Cheng. A 2013 paper in the same journal finally showed how the Shanghai ranking results could be reproduced. In a report from April 2009, J-C. Billaut, D. Bouyssou and Ph. Vincke analyse how the ARWU works, using their insights as specialists of Multiple Criteria Decision Making (MCDM). Their main conclusions are that the criteria used are not relevant; that the aggregation methodology has a number of major problems; and that insufficient attention has been paid to fundamental choices of criteria.

The ARWU researchers themselves, N.C. Liu and Y. Cheng, think that the quality of universities cannot be precisely measured by mere numbers and any ranking must be controversial. They suggest that university and college rankings should be used with caution and their methodologies must be understood clearly before reporting or using the results. ARWU has been criticised by the European Commission as well as some EU member states for "favour[ing] Anglo-Saxon higher education institutions". For instance, ARWU is repeatedly criticised in France, where it triggers an annual controversy, focusing on its ill-adapted character to the French academic system and the unreasonable weight given to research often performed decades ago. It is also criticised in France for its use as a motivation for merging universities into larger ones.

Several methods for ranking universities were analyzed. Many scholars proposed developing new methodologies for global university rankings, expressing concerns about bias against universities in the Arab region within current ranking systems. They emphasized the need to adjust the weighting of indicators to account for overlooked institutional differences.

Indeed, a further criticism has been that the metrics used are not independent of university size, e.g. number of publications or award winners will mechanically add as universities are grouped, independently of research (or teaching) quality; thus a merger between two equally-ranked institutions will significantly increase the merged institutions' score and give it a higher ranking, without any change in quality.

=== Subjects ===
There are two categories in ARWU's disciplinary rankings: broad subject fields and specific subjects. The methodology is similar to that adopted in the overall table, including award factors, paper citation, and the number of highly cited scholars.

- Natural sciences
  - Atmospheric science
  - Chemistry
  - Earth sciences
  - Ecology
  - Geography
  - Mathematics
  - Oceanography
  - Physics
- Engineering
  - Aerospace engineering
  - Automation and control
  - Biomedical engineering
  - Biotechnology
  - Chemical engineering
  - Civil engineering
  - Computer science and engineering
  - Electrical and electronic engineering
  - Energy science and Engineering
  - Environmental science and engineering
  - Food science and technology
  - Instruments science and technology
  - Marine/ocean engineering
  - Materials science and engineering
  - Mechanical engineering
  - Metallurgical engineering
  - Mining and mineral engineering
  - Nanoscience and nanotechnology
  - Remote sensing
  - Telecommunication engineering
  - Transportation science and technology
  - Water resources
- Life sciences
  - Agricultural sciences
  - Biological sciences
  - Human biological sciences
  - Veterinary sciences
- Medical sciences
  - Clinical medicine
  - Dentistry and oral sciences
  - Medical technology
  - Nursing
  - Pharmacy and pharmaceutical sciences
  - Public health
- Social sciences
  - Business administration
  - Communication
  - Economics
  - Education
  - Finance
  - Hospitality and tourism management
  - Law
  - Library and information science
  - Management
  - Political sciences
  - Psychology
  - Public administration
  - Sociology
  - Statistics

== Regional rankings ==
Considering the development of specific areas, two independent regional league tables with different methodologies were launched – Ranking of Top Universities in Greater China and Best Chinese Universities Ranking.

Best Chinese Universities Ranking was first released in 2015. Ranking of Top Universities in Greater China was first released in 2011.

=== Methodology ===
Methodology of Greater China Rankings (Note: Order shown in accordance with the latest result.)
Criterion	Indicator	Weight
Education	Percentage of graduate students	5%
Education	Percentage of non-local students	5%
Education	Ratio of academic staff to students	5%
Education	Doctoral degrees awarded	10%
Education	Alumni as Nobel Laureates & Fields Medalists	10%
Research	Annual research income	5%
Research	Nature & Science Papers	10%
Research	SCIE & SSCI papers	10%
Research	International patents	10%
Faculty	Percentage of academic staff with a doctoral degree	5%
Faculty	Staff as Nobel Laureates and Fields Medalists	10%
Faculty	Highly cited researchers	10%
Resources	Annual budget	5%

== See also ==
- List of Nobel laureates by university affiliation
