= Samuel C. Bradford =

British mathematician, librarian, and documentalist

Samuel Clement Bradford
- Born: 10 January 1878; London, England
- Died: 15 November 1948 (aged 70); United Kingdom
- Known for: The Bradford's law
- Scientific career
- Fields: Mathematics

Samuel Clement Bradford (10 January 1878 in London – 13 November 1948) was a British mathematician, librarian and documentalist at the Science Museum in London. He developed "Bradford's law" (or the "law of scattering") regarding differences in demand for scientific journals. This work influences bibliometrics and citation analysis of scientific publications. Bradford founded the British Society for International Bibliography (BSIB) (est. 1927) and he was elected president of International Federation for Information and Documentation (FID) in 1945. Bradford was a strong proponent of Universal Decimal Classification and of establishing abstracts of the scientific literature.

He became head of the Science Library in 1925 and became Keeper of the Science Library in 1930. He was succeeded in this role by Ernest Lancaster-Jones in 1935.

== Bibliography ==
- Bradford, S. C. "A Short Account of the Science Library." Aslib. Report of Proceedings (1924): p. 27-9.
- Bradford, S. C. (1934). Sources of information on specific subjects. Engineering, 26, p. 85–86.
- Bradford, S. C. (1946). Romance of Roses. London: F. Muller.
- Bradford, S. C. (1948). Documentation. London: Crosby Lockwood.
- Bradford, S. C. (1953). Documentation. 2nd ed. With an introd. by Jesse H. Shera and Margaret E. Egan. London: Crosby Lockwood.
