= Science Citation Index Expanded =

Citation index

- Producer: Clarivate (United States, United Kingdom)
- History: 1964; 62 years ago

Access
- Providers: Institute for Scientific Information
- Cost: Subscription

Coverage
- Disciplines: Science, medicine, and technology
- Record depth: Abstract, article length, cited references, data content, descriptive article titles, named author with author addresses
- Format coverage: Books, conference proceedings, journals
- Temporal coverage: 1900-present
- Geospatial coverage: Worldwide
- No. of records: 67 million
- Update frequency: Daily

Print edition
- ISSN: 0036-827X

Links
- Website: Science Citation Index Expanded

The Science Citation Index Expanded (SCIE) is a citation index owned by Clarivate and previously by Thomson Reuters. It was created by Eugene Garfield at the Institute for Scientific Information, launched in 1964 as Science Citation Index (SCI). It was later distributed via CD/DVD and became available online in 1997, when it acquired the current name.

The indexing database covers more than 9,200 notable and significant journals, across 178 disciplines, from 1900 to the present. These are alternatively described as the world's leading journals of science and technology, because of a rigorous selection process.

== Accessibility ==
The index is available online within Web of Science, as part of its Core Collection (there are also CD and printed editions, covering a smaller number of journals). The database allows researchers to search through over 53 million records from thousands of academic journals that were published by publishers from around the world.

== Specialty citation indexes ==
Clarivate previously marketed several subsets of this database, termed "Specialty Citation Indexes", such as the Neuroscience Citation Index and the Chemistry Citation Index, however these databases are no longer actively maintained.

The Chemistry Citation Index was first introduced by Eugene Garfield, a chemist by training. His original "search examples were based on [his] experience as a chemist". In 1992, an electronic and print form of the index was derived from a core of 330 chemistry journals, within which all areas were covered. Additional information was provided from articles selected from 4,000 other journals. All chemistry subdisciplines were covered: organic, inorganic, analytical, physical chemistry, polymer, computational, organometallic, materials chemistry, and electrochemistry. By 2002, the core journal coverage increased to 500 and related article coverage increased to 8,000 other journals. One 1980 study reported the overall citation indexing benefits for chemistry, examining the use of citations as a tool for the study of the sociology of chemistry and illustrating the use of citation data to "observe" chemistry subfields over time.

== Journal selection and evaluation criteria ==
To maintain the quality of the database, Clarivate employs a rigorous selection process governed by 24 quality criteria and four impact criteria. Journals considered for inclusion in the SCIE must first undergo an editorial triaging process that assesses basic publishing standards, such as scholarly peer review, ethical publishing practices, and technical requirements (like English-language bibliographic information). Once these quality benchmarks are met, the journals are evaluated for their citation impact and community influence. This process ensures that the index only contains "notable and significant" journals, distinguishing the SCIE from more inclusive databases like the Emerging Sources Citation Index (ESCI). Journals that fail to maintain these standards—such as those exhibiting predatory publishing behaviors or excessive self-citation—are subject to "de-listing" during annual re-evaluations, a process that can significantly affect a journal's professional standing and its Journal Impact Factor (JIF).

== Bibliometric impact and criticisms ==
The inclusion of a journal in the Science Citation Index Expanded is often viewed as a "seal of quality," significantly influencing the global prestige and financial viability of academic publications. Because the SCIE provides the underlying data for the Journal Impact Factor (JIF), it plays a central role in university rankings, faculty tenure decisions, and national research assessments. However, this reliance has drawn criticism from the scientific community. Organizations such as the San Francisco Declaration on Research Assessment (DORA) argue that SCIE-based metrics are frequently misused as a proxy for the quality of individual research articles rather than the journal as a whole. Critics also point to a geographical bias within the index, suggesting that Western, English-language journals are disproportionately represented compared to those from the Global South. This has led to concerns regarding "citation cartels" and the marginalization of regional scientific research that may be of high quality but lower global citation volume.

== See also ==
- Arts and Humanities Citation Index, which covers 1,130 journals, beginning with 1975.
- Emerging Sources Citation Index (ESCI)
- Google Scholar
- Impact factor
- List of academic databases and search engines
- Journal Citation Reports
- Social Sciences Citation Index, which covers 1,700 journals, beginning with 1956.
