= Scientometrics (journal) =

- Discipline: Scientometrics
- Language: English
- Edited by: Wolfgang Glänzel

Publication details
- History: 1978–present
- Publisher: Springer Science+Business Media
- Frequency: Monthly
- Impact factor: 3.238 (2020)

Standard abbreviations
- ISO 4: Scientometrics

Indexing
- CODEN: SCNTDX
- ISSN: 0138-9130 (print); 1588-2861 (web)
- LCCN: 79645095
- OCLC no.: 4846912

Links
- Journal homepage; Online archive

Scientometrics is a monthly peer-reviewed academic journal covering the field of scientometrics. It publishes original studies, short communications, review papers, letters to the editor, and book reviews. It is published by Akadémiai Kiadó and Springer Science+Business Media and was established in 1978. Its founder and first editor-in-chief was Tibor Braun.

== Abstracting and indexing ==
This journal is abstracted and indexed in:

- Biological Abstracts
- BIOSIS Previews
- Chemical Abstracts Service
- Current Contents/Social & Behavioral Sciences
- EBSCO databases
- Inspec
- ProQuest databases
- Science Citation Index Expanded
- Social Sciences Citation Index
- Scopus
- Zentralblatt Math

According to the Journal Citation Reports, the journal has a 2020 impact factor of 3.238.

== Plagiarism case ==
Jeffrey Beall reported that the editor of Scientometrics initially reacted indifferently to the discovery of extended word-for-word plagiarism in a 2013 article. The authors in question had copied material from a source and provided a citation, but had not used quotation marks. In the end, the article was retracted.
