= Eugene Garfield =

American linguist and businessman (1925–2017)

- Eugene Garfield at the Heritage Day awards in 2007
- Born: Eugene Eli Garfinkle; September 16, 1925; New York City, U.S.
- Died: February 26, 2017 (aged 91); Philadelphia, Pennsylvania, U.S.
- Education: Columbia University; University of Pennsylvania
- Known for: Impact factor; Bibliometrics; Scientometrics; Science Citation Index; Institute for Scientific Information
- Awards: John Price Wetherill Medal (1984); Derek de Solla Price Memorial Medal (1984); Alice G. Smith Lecture (2003); Richard J. Bolte Sr. Award (2007)
- Scientific career
- Thesis: An algorithm for translating chemical names to molecular formulas (1961)
- Website: Archived: Garfield Library

Eugene Eli Garfield (September 16, 1925 – February 26, 2017) was an American linguist and businessman, one of the founders of bibliometrics and scientometrics. He helped to create Current Contents, Science Citation Index (SCI), Journal Citation Reports, and Index Chemicus, among others, and founded the magazine The Scientist.

== Early life and education ==
Garfield was born in 1925 in New York City as Eugene Eli Garfinkle, his mother being of Lithuanian Jewish ancestry. His parents were second generation immigrants living in East Bronx in New York City. He studied at the University of Colorado and University of California, Berkeley before getting a Bachelor of Science degree in chemistry from Columbia University in 1949. Garfield also received a degree in Library Science from Columbia University in 1953. He went on to do his PhD in the Department of Linguistics at the University of Pennsylvania, which he completed in 1961 for developing an algorithm for translating chemical nomenclature into chemical formulas.

== Career and research ==
Working as a laboratory assistant at Columbia University after his graduation, Garfield indexed all previously synthesized compounds so that not to remake them, which helped him understand that his inclination to information towards science was bigger than towards chemistry.

In 1951, he got a position at the Welch Medical Library at Johns Hopkins University in Baltimore, Maryland, where most of the National Library of Medicine information systems were developed. There he built search and cataloging system methods using punch-cards. In 1953, at the First Symposium on Machine Methods in Scientific Documentation, Garfield got introduced to Shepard's Citations.

In 1960, Garfield founded the Institute for Scientific Information (ISI), which was located in Philadelphia, Pennsylvania. In the 1990s, ISI was faced with bankruptcy and was acquired by JPT Holdings who later sold it to Thomson (Thomas Business Information) where it formed a major part of the science division of Thomson Reuters. In October 2016 Thomson Reuters completed the sale of its intellectual property and science division; it is now known as Clarivate Analytics.

Garfield was responsible for many innovative bibliographic products, including Current Contents, the Science Citation Index (SCI), and other citation databases, the Journal Citation Reports, and Index Chemicus. He was the founding editor and publisher of The Scientist, a news magazine for life scientists. In 2003, the University of South Florida School of Information was honored to have him as lecturer for the Alice G. Smith Lecture. In 2007, he launched Histcite, a bibliometric analysis and visualization software package.

Following ideas inspired by Vannevar Bush's highly cited 1945 article As We May Think, Garfield undertook the development of a comprehensive citation index showing the propagation of scientific thinking; he started the Institute for Scientific Information in 1956 (it was sold to the Thomson Corporation in 1992). According to Garfield, "the citation index ... may help a historian to measure the influence of an article — that is, its 'impact factor'". The creation of the Science Citation Index made it possible to calculate impact factor, which ostensibly measures the importance of scientific journals. It led to the unexpected discovery that a few journals like Nature and Science were core for all of hard science. The same pattern does not happen with the humanities or the social sciences.

His entrepreneurial flair in having turned what was, at least at the time, an obscure and specialist metric into a highly profitable business has been noted. A scientometric analysis of his top fifty cited papers has been conducted.

Garfield's work led to the development of several information retrieval algorithms, like the HITS algorithm and PageRank. Both use the structured citation between websites through hyperlinks. Google co-founders Larry Page and Sergey Brin acknowledged Garfield in their development of PageRank, the algorithm that powers their company's search engine. Garfield published over 1,000 essays.

== Honors and awards ==
Garfield was honored with the Award of Merit from the Association for Information Science and Technology in 1975.

He was awarded the John Price Wetherill Medal in 1984, the Derek de Solla Price Memorial Medal in 1984, and the Miles Conrad Award in 1985. He was also awarded the Richard J. Bolte Sr. Award in 2007. He was elected to the American Philosophical Society that same year.

The Association for Library and Information Science Education has a fund for doctoral research through an award named after Garfield.

== Criticism ==
Writing in Physiology News, No. 69, Winter 2007, David Colquhoun of the Department of Pharmacology, University College London, described the "impact factor," a method for comparing scholarly journals, as "the invention of Eugene Garfield, a man who has done enormous harm to true science." Colquhoun ridiculed C. Hoeffel's assertion that Garfield's impact factor "has the advantage of already being in existence and is, therefore, a good technique for scientific evaluation" by saying, "you can't get much dumber than that. It is a 'good technique' because it is already in existence? There is something better. Read the papers."

== Personal life ==
Garfield is survived by a wife, three sons, a daughter, two granddaughters, and two great-grandchildren.
