= International Society for Scientometrics and Informetrics =

The International Society for Scientometrics and Informetrics was founded in 1993 in Berlin at the International Conference on Bibliometrics, Informetrics and Scientometrics. It is an association for professionals in the field of scientometrics.

This conference was the fourth of a series of prominent biennial conferences held under the auspices of the Society. The Society was incorporated in 1994 in the Netherlands (Utrecht); Dr Hildrun Kretschmer was elected its first President. In 2012 Ronald Rousseau is the 7th elected president. Among its members are scientists from over 30 countries.

== Mission ==
The Society aims to encourage communication and exchange of professional information in the field of scientometrics and informetrics, to improve standards, theory and practice in all areas of the discipline, to stimulate research, education and training, and to enhance the public perception of the discipline. Members of the society perform theoretical and practical studies related, but not restricted, to research evaluation, diffusion of information, quantitative web studies and mathematical and statistical modeling of information processes. Since 1987, (Diepenbeek, Belgium) the society (and its informal precursor) has organised a biennial international conference, which has visited all continents.

== Publications ==
ISSI publishes Quantitative Science Studies, the official open access journal of the organization. It publishes theoretical and empirical research on science and the scientific workforce. The Editor-in-Chief is Ludo Waltman and issues are available from MIT Press Journals.

It publishes a quarterly newsletter (ISSI Newsletter) for its members, but contents become freely available after three months. All colleagues are invited to contribute to this newsletter.

It has further published some Festschrifts (freely available for all) and made the proceedings of the latest conferences freely available for its members.
