= Inderscience Publishers =

Global academic publisher

- Founded: 1979
- Country of origin: Switzerland
- Headquarters location: Geneva
- Distribution: Worldwide
- Key people: M.A. Dorgham
- Nonfiction topics: science, engineering and economics
- Official website: Official website

Inderscience Publishers is a global academic publisher based in Geneva, Switzerland.

== Background ==
It publishes approximately 428 peer-reviewed journals in the fields of science, engineering and technology, management, public and business administration, environment, ecological economics, sustainable development, computing and ICT, and Internet/web services.

All papers submitted to Inderscience journals are double-blind refereed.

== Rankings ==
Inderscience has 247 journals indexed in Scopus and ranked by SCImago Journal Rank. As of May 2024 the top-ranked five of these journals were:

- International Journal of Technology Management (est. 1986, h-index = 51)
- International Journal of Environment and Pollution (est. 1991, h-index = 41) ISSN 1741-5101, 0957-4352
- International Journal of Mobile Communications (est. 2004, h-index = 38)
- International Journal of Vehicle Design (est. 1979, h-index = 37)
- International Journal of Bio-Inspired Computation (est. 2009, h-index = 33)

== See also ==
- Academic journal
- Academic publishing
- Journal ranking
- Lists of academic journals
- Rankings of academic publishers
- Scholar Indices and Impact
- Scientific journal
