= Rankings of academic publishers =

There are a number of approaches to ranking academic publishing groups and publishers. Rankings rely on subjective impressions by the scholarly community, on analyses of prize winners of scientific associations, discipline, a publisher's reputation, and its impact factor (particularly in the sciences).

== Ranking challenges ==
Publications are often judged by venue, rather than merit. This has been criticized in the Leiden Manifesto and the San Francisco Declaration on Research Assessment. According to the manifesto, "Science and technology indicators are prone to conceptual ambiguity and uncertainty and require strong assumptions that are not universally accepted. The meaning of citation counts, for example, has long been debated. Thus, best practice uses multiple indicators to provide a more robust and pluralistic picture."

Moreover, studies of methodological quality and reliability have found that "reliability of published research works in several fields may be decreasing with increasing journal rank", contrary to widespread expectations.

In a study assessing an increasingly-diversified array of publishers and their service to the academic community, Janice S. Lewis concluded that college and university librarians ranked university presses higher and commercial publishers lower than did members of the American Political Science Association.

According to Colin Steele, a librarian at the Australian National Library in Canberra, "Listings of publishers by title also fail to take into account that some university presses are strong in certain disciplines, but not across the whole spectrum." Rankings can vary widely by discipline.

== Australian Political Science rankings ==
The Australian Political Studies Association (APSA) ranked academic publishers in 2007, taking into consideration both book and journal publication. By 2022 this was replaced by a ranking of journal titles only.

In 2007, their top-ranked (A+) publishers were:

- Cambridge University Press
- University of Chicago Press
- Columbia University Press
- Harvard University Press
- MIT Press
- Oxford University Press/Clarendon (UK/US)
- Princeton University Press
- Stanford University Press
- University of California Press
- Yale University Press

In 2007, their second-ranked (A) publishers were:

- Alfred A. Knopf
- Allen & Unwin
- Cornell University Press
- Duke University Press
- Edward Elgar
- Elsevier Science Ltd
- IPA, Warsaw
- Johns Hopkins University Press
- Kluwer
- Manchester University Press
- Melbourne University Press
- New York University Press
- Palgrave MacMillan (UK and Australia, St. Martin's Press in US)
- Politico's
- Polity Press
- Routledge (Taylor and Francis)
- Sage Publishing
- Science Publishers
- Univ. of Pennsylvania Press
- University of Michigan Press
- University of Minnesota Press
- University of New South Wales Press
- University of Toronto Press
- WHO/EDM, Geneva
- Wiley-Blackwell
- AP, London
- Basic Books, New York
- Blackwell, Oxford
- Clarendon Press, Gloucestershire, UK
- CRC, Ghent, Belgium
- CRC, New York
- Harper & Row, New York
- John Wiley & Sons, West Sussex, UK
- Pergamon Press, Oxford/Amsterdam
- Prentice Hall, Eaglewood Cliffs (NJ), US
- Random House, New York
- Springer, London/Berlin

== SENSE rankings ==
The Research School for Socio-Economic and Natural Sciences of the Environment (SENSE Research School) has ranked scientific publishers every year from 2006 until 2022. This ranking was intended for internal use only and is not anymore available.

== Spanish National Research Council rankings ==
In 2012 and 2014, the Spanish National Research Council asked 11,864 Spanish academics to name the 10 most prestigious academic publishers from over 600 international and 500 Spanish-language publishers. It received 2,731 responses, a response rate of 23.05 percent. Results were compiled using a weighted average. The results were:

1. Cambridge University Press
2. Oxford University Press
3. Springer Nature
4. Routledge
5. Elsevier
6. Peter Lang
7. Thomson Reuters
8. Blackwell
9. De Gruyter
10. McGraw Hill
11. IGI Global

== Granada rankings ==
To quantitatively assess the output of a publishing company, in 2014 a research group associated with the University of Granada created a methodology based on the Thomson-Reuters Book Citation Index. The quantitative weight of the publishers is based on output data, impact (citations) and publisher profile. According to the Granada study, the 10 leading companies were:

1. Springer
2. Palgrave Macmillan
3. Routledge
4. Cambridge University Press
5. Elsevier
6. Nova Science Publishers
7. Edward Elgar
8. Information Age Publishing
9. Princeton University Press
10. University of California Press
11. IGI Global

== Libcitation rankings ==
The Research Impact Measurement Service (RIMS) at the University of New South Wales presented a quantitative methodology of bibliometric comparisons of book publishers. In a Journal of the American Society for Information Science and Technology article, Howard D. White et al. wrote: "Bibliometric measures for evaluating research units in the book-oriented humanities and social sciences are underdeveloped relative to those available for journal-oriented science and technology". The RIMS proposed what they called a "libcitation count", counting the libraries holding a given book as reported in a national (or international) union catalog. In the follow-up literature, comparing research units or even the output of publishing companies became the target of research. White et al. wrote,

Libcitation counts reflect judgments by librarians on the usefulness of publications for their various audiences of readers. The Libcitation measure thus resembles a citation impact measure in discriminating values of publications on a defined ground. It rewards authors whose books (or other publications) are seen by librarians as having relatively wide appeal. A book's absolute appeal can be determined simply by counting how many libraries hold it, but it can also be gauged in relation to other books in its subject class.

Libcitations, according to the RIMS, reflect what librarians know about the prestige of publishers, the opinions of reviewers, and the reputations of authors.

== See also ==
- Academic publishing
- Bibliometrics
- Citation impact
- Journal ranking
- Informetrics
- Publishing
