= Nova Science Publishers =

American academic publishing company

- Founded: 1985
- Founder: Frank H. Columbus
- Country of origin: United States
- Headquarters location: Hauppauge, New York
- Distribution: Worldwide
- Key people: Nadya Gotsiridze-Columbus (President); Donna Dennis (Vice-President)
- Publication types: Academic journals, books, encyclopedias, handbooks
- Nonfiction topics: Science and technology, medicine and biology, social sciences
- Fiction genres: Academic; STM
- Imprints: NOVA, NOVA Medicine & Health, SNOVA
- No. of employees: 55 in-house employees
- Official website: novapublishers.com

Nova Science Publishers is an academic publisher of books, encyclopedias, handbooks, e-books and journals, based in Hauppauge, New York. It was founded in 1985. Nova is included in Book Citation Index (part of Web of Science Core Collection) and scopus-indexed. A prolific publisher of books, Nova has received criticism from librarians for not always subjecting its publications to academic peer review and for republishing public domain book chapters and freely-accessible government publications at high prices.

== Overview ==
The company was founded in New York by Frank Columbus, former senior editor of Plenum Publishing. His wife, Nadya Columbus, took over the firm operations upon his death in 2010. While the firm publishes works in several fields of academia, most of its publications cover the fields of science, social science, and medicine.

As of February 2018, Nova listed 100 currently published journals. Since 2021, their new book publications include Digital Object Identifiers. As of 2022, Nova was approved in the Norwegian register for scientific journals, series and publishers, published by the Norwegian Directorate for Higher Education and Skills.

== Rankings ==
Nova is included in the Book Citation Index. In terms of number of books published from 2005 to 2012, Nova ranked 4th. They ranked in the top three in 8 of 14 scientific fields including engineering, clinical medicine, human biology, animal and plant biology, geosciences, social science medicine, health, chemistry, physics, and astronomy), and ranked as the 5th most prolific book publisher from 2009-2013, ranking 3rd in Engineering and Technology and 2nd in Science by numbers of books published.

However, it had the lowest citation impact among the five most prolific publishers in both fields. In a 2017 ranking study of book publishers, Nova was ranked high on number of books published, but low on number of citations per book. In 2018, it was ranked #13 on the global main publishers list of political sciences during the last 5 years.

In a 2011 report of twenty-one international social-science book publishers that determined penetration on international markets and mention of books in international science index systems, Nova was ranked #17. A 2017 survey of national and international databases of scholarly book publishers, including the Book Citation Index, Scopus, CRIStin, JUFO, VIRTA, and SPI, identified Nova as one of a "core of publishers that are indexed in all five" of the information systems surveyed. This "core" contained 46 out of the 3,765 publishers identified.

== Criticism ==
Nova has been criticized by librarians for not always evaluating authors through the academic peer review process and for republishing old public domain book chapters and freely-accessible government reports at high prices. The publisher was classified as a vanity press on Beall's List.
