= International Journal of Green Economics =

- Language: English
- Edited by: Miriam Kennet

Publication details
- History: 2006-present
- Publisher: Inderscience Publishers on behalf of the Green Economics Institute
- Frequency: Quarterly

Standard abbreviations
- ISO 4: Int. J. Green Econ.

Indexing
- ISSN: 1744-9928 (print); 1744-9936 (web)

Links
- Journal homepage; Journal website; Online archive

The International Journal of Green Economics (IJGE) is a quarterly peer-reviewed academic journal covering green economics. It was established in 2006 and is published by Inderscience Publishers on behalf of the Green Economics Institute. The editor-in-chief is Miriam Kennet.

== Abstracting and indexing ==
The journal is abstracted and indexed in:

- RePEc
- EconLit
- EconPapers
- Academic OneFile (Gale)
- Business Economics and Theory Collection (Gale)
- Scopus
- cnpLINKer (CNPIEC)
- Expanded Academic ASAP (Gale)
- ProQuest Advanced Technologies Database with Aerospace
- Francis (INIST-CNRS)
- General OneFile (Gale)
- Info Trac (Gale)
- Google Scholar
- Inspec (Institution of Engineering and Technology)
