= The German Journal of Industrial Relations =

- Language: English and German

Publication details
- History: 1994 to present
- Publisher: Verlag Barbara Budrich (Germany)
- Frequency: Quarterly
- Impact factor: 0.211 (SJR) (2015)

Standard abbreviations
- ISO 4: Ger. J. Ind. Relat.

Indexing
- ISSN: 0943-2779 (print); 1862-0035 (web)
- JSTOR: indubezi
- OCLC no.: 260076111

Links
- Journal homepage

The German Journal of Industrial Relations (German: Industrielle Beziehungen) is a peer-reviewed scientific journal publishing research in the field of industrial relations.

The journal appears quarterly. From 1994 to 2016 it was published by Rainer Hampp Verlag in Mering, and by Verlag Barbara Budrich starting in 2017. Manuscripts can be submitted in English or German.

According to the SCImago Journal Rank, the journal had a 2015 SJR indicator of 0.211.
