= International Society for Academic Research on Shamanism =

The International Society for Academic Research on Shamanism (ISARS), formerly the International Society for Shamanistic Research (ISSR), is a scholarly society dedicated to the study of shamanism and related topics. It was founded in 1988 by Mihály Hoppál. As of 2026, over 300 members were part of the organization.

The society hosts a biennial conference and published the academic journal Shaman.

== ISARS Conference ==
The society hosts conference every two years. The 2026 conference was held in Seoul, Korea from 24–27 June 2026.

== Shaman ==
Shaman
- Discipline: Shamanism
- Language: English
- Edited by: Ádám Molnár

Publication details
- Publisher: Molnár & Kelemen Oriental Publishers
- Frequency: Biannual

Standard abbreviations
- ISO 4: Shaman

Indexing
- ISSN: 1216-7827
- LCCN: 95640243
- OCLC no.: 30684402

Links
- Journal homepage

Shaman is the peer-reviewed journal of the society. It was established in 1993 and is published by Molnár & Kelemen Oriental Publishers. It publishes academic research, as well as reviews of books and other media. It publishes two numbers a year, in an annual volume.

The journal is abstracted and indexed in the following bibliographic databases:

- ATLA Religion Database
- Modern Language Association Database
- Scopus

According to Scopus, it has a 2025 CiteScore of 0.2, ranking 618th out of 760 in the category "Religious Studies", 1204th out of 1434 in the category "Cultural Studies", and 489th out of 536 in the category "Anthropology".
