= Edward Elgar Publishing =

Academic publishing company

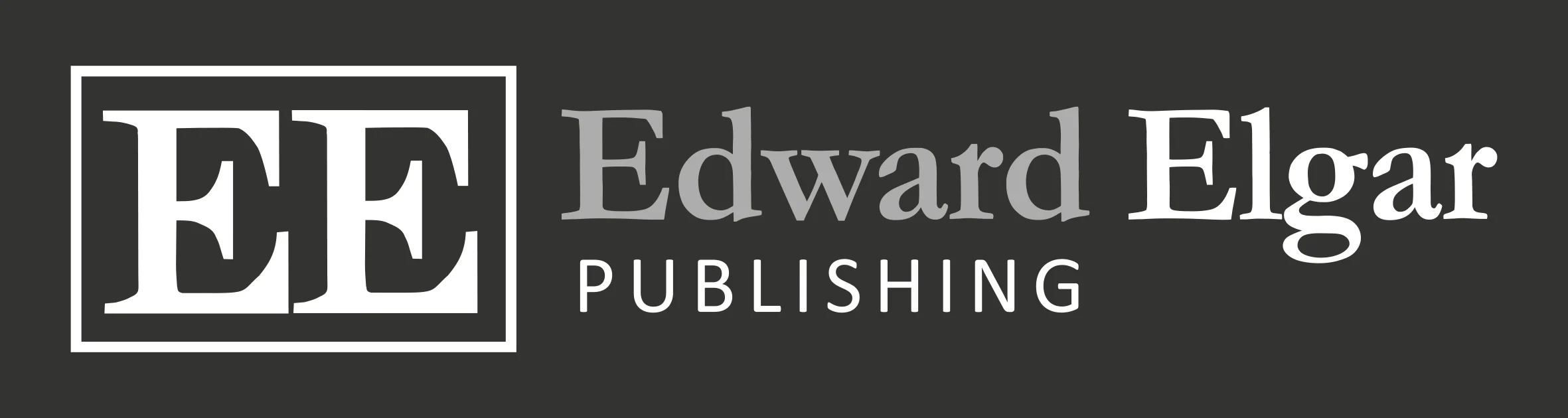
- The company's logo
- Founded: 1986
- Founder: Edward Elgar
- Country of origin: United Kingdom
- Headquarters location: Cheltenham
- Distribution: Wiley Distribution (Europe); Books International (the Americas); MHM Limited (Japan); Taylor & Francis (East and Southeast Asia)
- Publication types: Books, journals
- Nonfiction topics: Social sciences, Management, Law
- Imprints: EE
- No. of employees: 99
- Official website: www.e-elgar.com

Edward Elgar Publishing is a global publisher of academic books, journals and online resources in the social sciences and law. The company also publishes a social science and law blog with regular contributions from leading scholars.

== About ==
The company's Cheltenham office

Edward Elgar Publishing, founded in 1986, is an independent family-owned international publisher, with offices in Cheltenham and Camberley in the UK and Northampton, Massachusetts, in the USA. It specializes in the academic and professional market and publishes in the field of economics, law, management studies, public policy and social policy and the environment. The company has over 8,500 book titles in print and publishes more than 700 new titles a year.

== History ==
The first Edward Elgar Publishing book titles were published in 1987 and included The Economics of Education and the Education of an Economist by Mark Blaug, The Economic Revival of Modern Britain by David Coates and John Hillard, and Economic Choice Under Uncertainty by J.L. Ford.

Edward Elgar Publishing is a family-run business. The company is named after the founder and current Chairman Edward Elgar who moved to Gloucestershire to start the business in 1986, from the study of the family home in Middleton. There is no known connection to the famous English composer Edward Elgar.

== Awards and reputation ==
In 2026, coinciding with the company's 40th anniversary celebrations, Edward Elgar Publishing won the Clarivate Educational and Professional Publisher of the Year award for the fourth time at the Independent Publishers Guild annual awards in London. The judges highlighted "great commissioning and investment in systems and staff, an approach to lower-income countries that makes content as accessible as possible and superb service to customers and authors".

In 2023, Edward Elgar Publishing received the CPI Independent Publisher of the Year and ProQuest Academic and Professional Publisher of the Year awards at the Independent Publishers Guild (IPG) Awards, the second time they have been given the overall award. The judges commented that the publisher cemented its reputation for excellent care of staff, authors and customers alike... “Edward Elgar combines longevity with constant innovation: they never rest on what they have achieved and always strive to stay the best in their field. The growth is exceptional for a mature business, and there’s a holistic strategy that works… it’s a special business.”

In 2017, Edward Elgar Publishing was awarded the prestigious Fox Williams Independent Publisher of the Year Award at the Independent Publishers Guild (IPG) Awards. As a "resolutely forward-looking business", expanding into law publishing and building digital platform Elgaronline, the judges praised EEP for "punching way above its weight despite competition from far larger operators". "Edward Elgar produced an outstanding performance in a difficult market in 2016," the judges said. "It is a very well run and profitable company with excellent partnerships, great author care and consistently superb customer service." At the same awards ceremony, EEP was also awarded the ProQuest Academic & Professional Publisher of the Year Award 2017. This brings the tally of major awards received in the last four years to six.

In 2015, the firm was nominated for three awards at the Independent Publishing Awards and won the Digital Publishing Award for their www.ElgarOnline.com online ebook and journal content platform. The judges cited the "excellent site design and back-end technology" and also applauded the way it provided free content to libraries in poorer countries: "That is sensible, creditable and important." In March 2015 Edward Elgar Publishing was also shortlisted by The Bookseller for the Independent Academic, Educational and Professional Publisher of the Year Award to be presented at Awards dinner in May 2015. The Bookseller said Elgar was "trying for an unprecedented third win on the trot". The Bookseller has been the leading British business magazine for the book industry since 1858.

In 2014, Edward Elgar Publishing won the award for Independent Academic, Educational and Professional Publisher of the Year at the annual industry awards hosted by The Bookseller in London. In the same year the company won the Frankfurt Book Fair Academic and Professional Publisher of the Year award at the Independent Publishers Guild (IPG) awards. The Bookseller noted the publisher's "renowned author care and entrepreneurial approach", while the IPG reported that "Edward Elgar is incredibly professional, responsive and imaginative. It is a great example of how a relatively small publisher can be at least as innovative as those many times its size".

Edward Elgar Publishing had previous won the Bookseller award in 2013. At that time the award was given for "achieving record sales in a tough market, launching digital platform Elgaronline and for its "high-class editorial, design and production". The company was also shortlisted by the IPG in 2013 and 2012. In 2013 the IPG cited "growing sales and high quality publishing.... Epitomising the agility of an owner-run business, it consolidated its position as a leader in its field and pushed on with innovative products", The Bookseller cited the firm's "big investment in a new Elgaronline platform"

A 2012 working paper claimed that Elgar was the most cited publisher in Management, second most cited in Law, fourth in Economics/ Business and sixth in Political Science and International Relations in the Thomson Reuters Social Science Citation Index.

Other Rankings of academic publishers include Edward Elgar Publishing as a leading publisher, including the Australian Political Science rankings (Ranked as A) and the Granada ranking (Top 10).

== Company developments ==
The publisher has been offering Open Access publishing options to authors since 2013 and reached a Read and Publish transitional agreement with the UK academic consortia JISC in 2023 to ensure compliance with research funder mandates.

The company launched a journals programme in 2010 and now publishes a number of scholarly journals, such as the Review of Keynesian Economics and more recently the Cambridge International Law Journal. In 2012 the company launched a new blog for its authors to discuss their work and research, Elgarblog, while early 2013 saw the launch of Edward Elgar Publishing's new digital content platform, Elgaronline.

== Notable authors ==
Edward Elgar Publishing counts amongst its authors a number of recipients of the Nobel Prize in Economics. In 2011, the company published Nobel laureate Elinor Ostrom.
