= Review of Keynesian Economics =

- Discipline: Economics
- Language: English
- Edited by: Thomas Palley, Esteban Pérez Caldentey, Julia Braga

Publication details
- History: 2012–present
- Publisher: Edward Elgar Publishing
- Frequency: Quarterly

Standard abbreviations
- ISO 4: Rev. Keynes. Econ.

Indexing
- ISSN: 2049-5323 (print); 2049-5331 (web)

Links
- Journal homepage; Online access; Online archive

The Review of Keynesian Economics (ROKE) is a quarterly double-blind peer-reviewed academic journal covering Keynesian and Post-Keynesian economics, although it is also open to other heterodox traditions. It is published by Edward Elgar Publishing and was established in 2012. The journal was co-founded by Thomas Palley (New America Foundation), Louis-Philippe Rochon (Laurentian University), and Matías Vernengo (Bucknell University). The goal was a broad Keynesian journal that encompassed all the different Keynesian schools of thought. Palley has written a brief account of how the journal came to be. Louis-Philippe Rochon was instrumental in creating the journal. In 2018 Rochon stepped down and became Editor Emeritus and he was replaced by Esteban Pérez Caldentey (Economic Commission for Latin America and the Caribbean) as the third co-editor.

== Abstracting and indexing ==
The journal is abstracted and indexed in:

- Research Papers in Economics
- Current Contents/Social & Behavioral Sciences
- Social Sciences Citation Index
- EconLit
- Business Source Complete
