= SCImago Journal Rank =

Metric of scholarly journals

The SCImago Journal Rank (SJR) indicator is a measure of the prestige of scholarly journals that accounts for both the number of citations received by a journal and the prestige of the journals where the citations come from.

== Etymology ==
The SCImago group associates its name with Latin phrase imago scientiae, which translates to "visualization of science".

== Rationale ==
Citations are an indicator of popularity of scientific works and can be perceived as endorsement; prestige can be understood as a combination of the number of endorsements and the prestige of the works publishing them. Adopting this view, the SJR indicator assigns different values to citations depending on the perceived prestige of the journals where they come from.

However, studies of methodological quality and reliability have found that "reliability of published research works in several fields may be decreasing with increasing journal rank", contrary to widespread expectations.

The calculation of the SJR indicator is similar to the Eigenfactor score, with the former being based on the Scopus database and the latter on the Web of Science database, among other differences.

The SJR methodology was revised in 2012, creating SJR2, which is "designed to weight the citations according to the prestige of the citing journal, also taking into account the thematic closeness of the citing and the cited journals."

== Computation ==
A journal's SJR indicator is a numeric value representing the average number of weighted citations received during a selected year per document published in that journal during the previous three years, as indexed by Scopus. Higher SJR indicator values are meant to indicate greater journal prestige. SJR is developed by the Scimago Lab, originated from a research group at the University of Granada.

The SJR indicator is a variant of the eigenvector centrality measure used in network theory. Such measures establish the importance of a node in a network based on the principle that connections to high-scoring nodes contribute more to the score of the node. The SJR indicator has been developed to be used in extremely large and heterogeneous journal citation networks. It is a size-independent indicator and its values order journals by their "average prestige per article" and can be used for journal comparisons in science evaluation processes. The SJR indicator is a free journal metric inspired by, and using an algorithm similar to, PageRank.

The SJR indicator computation is carried out using an iterative algorithm that distributes prestige values among the journals until a steady-state solution is reached. The SJR algorithm begins by setting an identical amount of prestige to each journal, then using an iterative procedure, this prestige is redistributed in a process where journals transfer their achieved prestige to each other through citations. The process ends up when the difference between journal prestige values in consecutive iterations do not reach a minimum threshold value any more. The process is developed in two phases, (a) the computation of Prestige SJR (PSJR) for each journal: a size-dependent measure that reflects the whole journal prestige, and (b) the normalization of this measure to achieve a size-independent measure of prestige, the SJR indicator.

In addition to the network-based SJR indicator, the SJR also provides a more direct alternative to the impact factor (IF), in the form of average citations per document in a 2-year period, abbreviated as Cites per Doc. (2y).

== Results ==
The SCImago web site gives both the SJR and H index, and the results are quite different. Here are the journals ranking in the top three for each of the metrics.

Title	SJR Rank	H Index Rank
Nature	17	1
Science	56	2
New England Journal of Medicine	11	3
Ca-A Cancer Journal for Clinicians	1	621
Foundations and Trends in Machine Learning	2	10205
Nature Reviews Molecular Cell Biology	3	28

== See also ==
- SCImago Institutions Rankings
- Journal-level metrics
- CiteScore
- Journal Citation Reports
- Journalology
- Impact factor
