= Leiden Manifesto for Research Metrics =

22 April 2015 published comment in Nature

The Leiden Manifesto for Research Metrics
- Authors: Diana Hicks, Paul Wouters, Ludo Waltman, Sarah de Rijcke, Ismael Rafols
- Publisher: Nature
- Publication date: 22 April 2015
- Website: leidenmanifesto.org

The Leiden Manifesto for Research Metrics (also known as the Leiden Manifesto) is a 22 April 2015 published comment in Nature that includes a list of "ten principles to guide research evaluation". It was formulated by public policy professor Diana Hicks, scientometrics professor Paul Wouters, and their colleagues at the 19th International Conference on Science and Technology Indicators, held between 3–5 September 2014 in Leiden, The Netherlands.

The Leiden Manifesto was proposed as a guide to combat misuse of bibliometrics when evaluating scientific research literature. Examples of commonly used bibliometrics for science, or scientometrics, are the h-index, impact factor, other indicators such as Altmetrics. According to the Manifesto's authors, these metrics often pervasively misguide evaluations of scientific material.

== Motivation ==
Motivations for codification of the Leiden Manifesto arose from a growing worry that "impact-factor obsession" was leading to inadequate judgement of scientific material that should be worthy of fair evaluation. Lead author Diana Hicks hoped that publishing the list in Nature would spread its ideas, already commonplace in the scientometrics sphere, to the broader scientific community.

=== DORA and other predecessors ===
The scientific community has long been interested in reforming assessment of the impact of scientific and academic research. The 2013 San Francisco Declaration on Research Assessment (DORA), which has been signed by over 27,000 individuals as of March 2026, was a major influence on the Leiden Manifesto. The Declaration denounced common practices in research assessment, such as using journal impact factor to assess the contributions of individual researchers.

One of the main concerns about overuse of citation-based performance indicators came from the observation that smaller research organizations and institutions may be negatively affected by their metric indices. In one public debate at the Centre for Science and Technology Studies at Leiden University, it was acknowledged that indicators which measure citations may give "more weight to publications from fields with a high expected number of citations than to publications from fields with a low expected number of citations".

Although the main focus of the Leiden Manifesto is the use of scientometrics for research evaluation, the authors also consider how overuse of metrics can adversely affect the wider scholarly community, such as the position of universities in global rankings. According to Hicks et al., scientific metrics such as citation rate are used far too much for ranking the quality of universities (and thus the quality of their research output).

=== Journal impact factor ===
The background of the Leiden Manifesto describes why misusing metrics is becoming a larger problem in the scientific community. The journal impact factor, originally created by Eugene Garfield as a method for librarians to collect data to facilitate selecting journals to purchase, is now mainly used as a method of judging journal quality. This is seen by the authors as an abuse of data in order to examine research too hastily. For example, an impact factor, while a good metric to measure the size and experience of a journal, may or may not be sufficient to accurately describe the quality of its papers, and even less so for a single paper.

== Content ==
The Leiden Manifesto consists of ten principles which aim to reform how research quality is assessed by academic publishers and institutions. It emphasizes detailed and close evaluation of research, rather than relying exclusively on quantitative data. It also aims to remove possible perverse incentives for using scientometrics, such as judgement of academic capability and university quality.

=== Ten principles ===
The ten principles of the Leiden Manifesto are as follows:

1. Quantitative evaluation should support qualitative, expert assessment.
2. Measure performance against the research missions of the institution, group, or researcher.
3. Protect excellence in locally relevant research.
  - Allow research taking place in a certain area or field to be published in corresponding local research publications, instead of prioritizing high-impact journals. Many high-impact journals are in English, which may decrease needed specificity when publishing a paper meant to study locational characteristics. As an example, in high-impact Spanish-language papers, "topics such as local labor laws" and other features designated for sociologists may be lost.
4. Keep data collection and analytical processes open, transparent, and simple.
5. Allow those evaluated to verify data and analysis.
6. Account for variation by field in publication and citation practices.
  - Peer-review and citation rate can vary wildly across differing disciplines, for example, "top-ranked journals in mathematics have impact factors of around 3; top-ranked journals in cell biology have impact factors of about 30".
7. Base assessment of individual researchers on a qualitative judgement of their portfolio.
8. Avoid misplaced concreteness and false precision.
  - Use of scientific indicators may precede strong assumptions that are not necessarily correct. For example, when looking at a specific scientist, a low citation rate may lead the investigator to assume low research quality, which is implying causation from correlation. Providing clarification, as well as multiple, robust indicators, may reduce inappropriate concreteness. False precision is possible when indicator producers, such as Clarivate (which publishes the annual Journal Citation Reports) attempt to create an exact journal impact factor (i.e. three decimal places). Conceptual ambiguity and random variability of citation counts make it unnecessary to distinguish indices such as journal impact factors to such a precise extent, because it can foster excessive comparison and competition between publishers.
9. Recognize the systemic effects of assessment and indicators.
10. Scrutinize indicators regularly and update them.

== Reception ==
=== 2016 John Ziman Award ===
In 2016, the European Association for the Study of Science and Technology (EASST) gave its John Ziman Award to the Leiden Manifesto for its effort to widen scientometrics knowledge to the scientific community as a whole. EASST president Fred Steward stated that it "emphasizes situatedness, in terms of different cognitive domains and research missions as well as the wider socioeconomic, national and regional context".

=== Institutions ===
LIBER, a collaboration of European research libraries, issued a substantial review of the Leiden Manifesto in 2017, concluding that it was a "solid foundation" on which academic libraries could base their assessment of metrics.

Elsevier announced on 14 July 2020 that it would use the Leiden Manifesto to guide its development of improved research evaluation. Elsevier stated that the principles of the manifesto were already close in nature to their 2019 CiteScore metrics, which was in summary "improved calculation methodology" for "a more robust, fair and faster indicator of research impact".

Loughborough University's LIS-Bibliometrics committee chose to base their own principles on the Leiden Manifesto, instead of the DORA, because the manifesto takes a "broader approach to the responsible use of all bibliometrics across a range of disciplines and settings", according to their policy manager Elizabeth Gadd. Stephen Curry, chair of the DORA steering committee, commented on this statement by emphasizing that DORA was aiming to extend its "disciplinary and geographical reach".

=== Further applications ===
David Moher and his co-authors referenced the Leiden Manifesto in a perspective for Issues in Science and Technology, writing that academic institutions were not asking the "right questions" (concerning research planning, timeframe, reproducibility, and results) when assessing scientists. They criticize what they see as an obsession with journal impact factors and the "gaming" of scientometrics, advocating that institutions use DORA and the Leiden Manifesto principles instead when assessing individual scientists and research.

In a letter in Science and Engineering Ethics, T. Kanchan and Kewal Krishan called the Leiden Manifesto "one of the best criteria" for assessing scientific research, especially considering the "rat race" for publications in the scholarly community. They also argue that use of the Manifesto will lead to "progress of science and society at large".

== See also ==
- San Francisco Declaration on Research Assessment
- Nature (journal)
- Scientometrics (journal)
- Bibliometrics
- Scientometrics
- H-index
- Impact factor
- Altmetrics
