= The Baha'i Faith: The Emerging Global Religion =

Book by William S. Hatcher and Douglas Martin

The Baha'i Faith: The Emerging Global Religion is a 1984 book written by William Hatcher and Douglas Martin on the Baha'i religion. The book has been designated by the Encyclopaedia Britannica as one of the ten books of the year "that have made significant contributions to knowledge and understanding" in the domain of religion. They described the book as "a comprehensive introduction to the history, philosophy and practices of one of the youngest religions of the world".

The book was published four times: Harper & Row, San Francisco, 1985, xvii+228 pages; 1st softcover edition, 1989; 2nd revised edition, Bahá’í Publishing Trust, Wilmette, 1998, xviii+253 pages; revised and republished 2002, Bahá’í Publishing, Wilmette, xvi+253 pages. Harper and Row, the first publisher of the book is a highly credible academic publisher with ranking A.

William Hatcher, one of the authors of the book, is listed in Encyclopédie Philosophique Universelle as one of the eight Platonist philosophers of the second half of the twentieth century.
