= Citation impact =

Method of measuring the impact of scholarly journals and articles

Citation impact, also known as citation metric, is a measure of how often an academic article, journal, book, author, or institution is cited. Citation count is a raw score equal to the number of citations received (considered in a given citation index) while citation frequency or citation rate is a normalized value given by the ratio of citation counts to number articles published by the journal or author group during a given time period; for example, 5 citations received by 10 articles would result in a citation frequency of 0.5=5/10.

Citation metrics, such as the journal impact factor or the citescore, are interpreted as measures of the impact or influence of academic work and have given rise to the field of bibliometrics or scientometrics, specializing in the study of patterns of academic impact through citation analysis. The importance of journals can be measured by the average citation rate, It is used by academic institutions in decisions about academic tenure, promotion and hiring, and hence also used by authors in deciding which journal to publish in. Citation-like measures are also used in other fields that do ranking, such as Google's PageRank algorithm, software metrics, college and university rankings, and business performance indicators.

== Article-level ==
One of the most basic citation metrics is how often an article was cited in other articles, books, or other sources (such as theses). Citation rates are heavily dependent on the discipline and the number of people working in that area. For instance, many more scientists work in neuroscience than in mathematics, and neuroscientists publish more papers than mathematicians, hence neuroscience papers are much more often cited than papers in mathematics. Similarly, review papers are more often cited than regular research papers because they summarize results from many papers. This may also be the reason why papers with shorter titles get more citations, given that they are usually covering a broader area.

=== Most-cited papers ===
The most-cited paper in history is a paper by Oliver Lowry describing an assay to measure the concentration of proteins. By 2014 it had accumulated more than 305,000 citations. The 10 most cited papers all had more than 40,000 citations. To reach the top-100 papers required 12,119 citations by 2014. Of Thomson Reuter's Web of Science database with more than 58 million items only 14,499 papers (~0.026%) had more than 1,000 citations in 2014.

== Author-level ==
Total citations, or average citation count per article, can be reported for an individual author or researcher. Many other measures have been proposed, beyond simple citation counts, to better quantify an individual scholar's citation impact. The best-known author-level measures include total citations and the h-index. Each measure has advantages and disadvantages, spanning from bias to discipline-dependence and limitations of the citation data source. Counting the number of citations per paper is also employed to identify the authors of citation classics.

Citations are distributed highly unequally among researchers. In a study based on the Web of Science database across 118 scientific disciplines, the top 1% most-cited authors accounted for 21% of all citations. Between 2000 and 2015, the proportion of citations that went to this elite group grew from 14% to 21%. The highest concentrations of 'citation elite' researchers were in the Netherlands, the United Kingdom, Switzerland and Belgium. 70% of the authors in the Web of Science database have fewer than 5 publications, so that the most-cited authors among the 4 million included in this study constitute a tiny fraction.

== Journal-level ==
The simplest journal-level metric is the journal impact factor, the average number of citations that articles published by a journal in the previous two years have received in the current year, as calculated by Clarivate. Other companies report similar metrics, such as the CiteScore, based on Scopus.

However, very high journal impact factor or CiteScore are often based on a small number of very highly cited papers. For instance, most papers in Nature (impact factor 38.1, 2016) were only cited 10 or 20 times during the reference year (see figure). Journals with a lower impact (e.g. PLOS ONE, impact factor 3.1) publish many papers that are cited 0 to 5 times but few highly cited articles.

Journal-level metrics are often misinterpreted as a measure for journal quality or article quality. However, the use of non-article-level metrics to determine the impact of a single article is statistically invalid. Moreover, studies of methodological quality and reliability have found that "reliability of published research works in several fields may be decreasing with increasing journal rank", contrary to widespread expectations.

Citation distribution is skewed for journals because a very small number of articles are driving the vast majority of citations; therefore, some journals have stopped publicizing their impact factor, e.g. the journals of the American Society for Microbiology. Citation counts follow mostly a lognormal distribution, except for the long tail, which is better fit by a power law.

Other journal-level metrics include the Eigenfactor, and the SCImago Journal Rank.

== Criticism ==
The advent of citation impact metrics starting around the 1960s created incentives and pressure from their institutions for scientists to publish works in journals known for publishing highly cited papers, which in turn increased the subscription demand and prices for those journals. Technology historian Edward Tenner points out that a paper which makes an incorrect claim concerning a fundamental topic can attract a large number of citations for the purpose of debunking it; citation impact is thus not a good measure of quality or accuracy.

== Altmetrics ==
An alternative approach to measure a scholar's impact relies on usage data, such as number of downloads from publishers and analyzing citation performance, often at article level.

As early as 2004, the BMJ published the number of views for its articles, which was found to be somewhat correlated to citations. In 2008 the Journal of Medical Internet Research began publishing views and Tweets. These "tweetations" proved to be a good indicator of highly cited articles, leading the author to propose a "Twimpact factor", which is the number of Tweets it receives in the first seven days of publication, as well as a Twindex, which is the rank percentile of an article's Twimpact factor.

In response to growing concerns over the inappropriate use of journal impact factors in evaluating scientific outputs and scientists themselves, Université de Montréal, Imperial College London, PLOS, eLife, EMBO Journal, The Royal Society, Nature and Science proposed citation distributions metrics as alternative to impact factors.

== Citation analysis ==
An important recent development in research on citation impact is the discovery of universality, or citation impact patterns that hold across different disciplines in the sciences, social sciences, and humanities. For example, it has been shown that the number of citations received by a publication, once properly rescaled by its average across articles published in the same discipline and in the same year, follows a universal log-normal distribution that is the same in every discipline. This finding has suggested a universal citation impact measure that extends the h-index by properly rescaling citation counts and resorting publications, however the computation of such a universal measure requires the collection of extensive citation data and statistics for every discipline and year. Social crowdsourcing tools such as Scholarometer have been proposed to address this need. Kaur et al. proposed a statistical method to evaluate the universality of citation impact metrics, i.e., their capability to compare impact fairly across fields. Their analysis identifies universal impact metrics, such as the field-normalized h-index.

Research suggests the impact of an article can be, partly, explained by superficial factors and not only by the scientific merits of an article. Field-dependent factors are usually listed as an issue to be tackled not only when comparison across disciplines are made, but also when different fields of research of one discipline are being compared. For instance in Medicine among other factors the number of authors, the number of references, the article length, and the presence of a colon in the title influence the impact. Whilst in Sociology the number of references, the article length, and title length are among the factors. Also it is found that scholars engage in ethically questionable behavior in order to inflate the number of citations articles receive.

Automated citation indexing has changed the nature of citation analysis research, allowing millions of citations to be analyzed for large scale patterns and knowledge discovery. The first example of automated citation indexing was CiteSeer, later to be followed by Google Scholar. More recently, advanced models for a dynamic analysis of citation aging have been proposed. The latter model is even used as a predictive tool for determining the citations that might be obtained at any time of the lifetime of a corpus of publications.

Some researchers also propose that the journal citation rate on Wikipedia, next to the traditional citation index, "may be a good indicator of the work's impact in the field of psychology."

According to Mario Biagioli: "All metrics of scientific evaluation are bound to be abused. Goodhart's law [...] states that when a feature of the economy is picked as an indicator of the economy, then it inexorably ceases to function as that indicator because people start to game it."

=== Open Access publications ===
Open access publications are accessible without cost to readers, hence they would be expected to be cited more frequently. Some experimental and observational studies have found that articles published in open access journals do not receive more citations, on average, than those published in subscription journals; other studies have found that they do.

The evidence that author-self-archived ("green") open access articles are cited more than non open access articles is somewhat stronger than the evidence that ("gold") open access journals are cited more than non open access journals. Two reasons for this are that many of the top-cited journals today are still only hybrid open access (author has the option to pay for gold) and many pure author-pays open access journals today are either of low quality or downright fraudulent "predatory journals," preying on authors' eagerness to publish-or-perish, thereby lowering the average citation counts of open access journals.

== See also ==
- Mathematical Citation Quotient
