= William S. Hatcher =

American mathematician (1935–2005)

William S. Hatcher (1935–2005) was an American mathematician, philosopher, educator and a member of the Baháʼí Faith. He held a doctorate in mathematics from the University of Neuchatel, Switzerland, and bachelor's and master's degrees from Vanderbilt University in Nashville, Tennessee. A specialist in the philosophical alloying of science and religion, for over thirty years he held university positions in North America, Europe, and Russia.

== Biography ==
He was born in Charlotte, North Carolina, United States on 20 September 1935, and died on 27 November 2005.

== Work and achievements ==
Hatcher is one of eight Platonist philosophers listed for the second half of the twentieth century in the Encyclopedie Philosophique Universelle.

Hatcher was the author of over fifty monographs, books, and articles in the mathematical sciences, logic and philosophy. The Baha'i Faith: The Emerging Global Religion, co-authored with Douglas Martin, was named by Encyclopedia Britannica in 1986 as book of the year in religion.

Among the publications of which he is author or coauthor are:

- The Foundations of Mathematics (1968)
- Absolute Algebra (with Stephen Whitney, 1978)
- The Science of Religion (1980)
- The Logical Foundations of Mathematics (1982)
- Calculus is Algebra (1982). The American Mathematical Monthly, 89(6), 362–370.
- The Baha'i Faith: The Emerging Global Religion (1984)
- Logic and Logos: Essays on Science, Religion and Philosophy (1990)
- The Law of Love Enshrined (1996)
- The Ethics of Authenticity (1997)
- Love, Power, and Justice (1998)
- Minimalism: A Bridge between Classical Philosophy and the Baha'i Revelation (2002)

== Relationship to the Baháʼí Faith ==
He served on National Spiritual Assembly of the Baha'is of Canada (1983–91) as well as on the inaugural National Spiritual Assemblies of Switzerland (1962–65) and the Russian Federation (1996). He lived in Russia from 1993 to 1998. He was also a founding member of the Association for Baháʼí Studies.

== See also ==
- Proof of the Truthful
