= Minimalism: A Bridge Between Classical Philosophy and the Bahaʼi Revelation =

2004 book by William S. Hatcher

Minimalism: A Bridge between Classical Philosophy and the Baha'i Revelation is a book by William S. Hatcher, published in 2004. Hatcher attempts to prove God's existence while addressing many of the criticisms raised against previous theistic philosophers.
