= Eigenfactor =

Rating of the total importance of a scientific journal

The Eigenfactor score, developed by Jevin West and Carl Bergstrom at the University of Washington, is a rating of the total importance of a scientific journal. Journals are rated according to the number of incoming citations, with citations from highly ranked journals weighted to make a larger contribution to the eigenfactor than those from poorly ranked journals. As a measure of importance, the Eigenfactor score scales with the total impact of a journal. All else equal, journals generating higher impact to the field have larger Eigenfactor scores. Citation metrics like eigenfactor or PageRank-based scores reduce the effect of self-referential groups.

Eigenfactor scores and Article Influence scores (AIS) are calculated by eigenfactor.org, where they can be freely viewed. The Eigenfactor score is intended to measure the importance of a journal to the scientific community, by considering the origin of the incoming citations, and is thought to reflect how frequently an average researcher would access content from that journal. However, the Eigenfactor score is influenced by the size of the journal, so that the score doubles when the journal doubles in size (measured as number of published articles per year). The Article Influence score measures the average influence of articles in the journal, and is therefore comparable to the traditional impact factor.

The Eigenfactor approach is thought to be more robust than the impact factor metric, which purely counts incoming citations without considering the significance of those citations. While the Eigenfactor score is correlated with total citation count for medical journals, these metrics provide significantly different information. For a given number of citations, citations from more significant journals will result in a higher Eigenfactor score. Eigenfactor is similar to Eigenvector centrality and PageRank.

Originally Eigenfactor scores were measures of a journal's importance; it has been extended to author-level. It can also be used in combination with the h-index to evaluate the work of individual scientists.

== See also ==
- Impact factor
- Journalology
- PageRank
- Journal Citation Reports
- SCImago Journal Rank
