= San Francisco Declaration on Research Assessment =

2012 manifesto against using the journal impact factor to assess a scientist's work

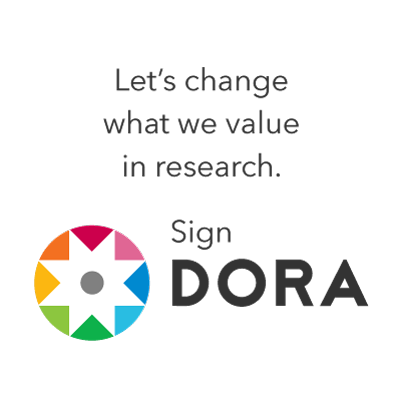
- Formation: 13 May 2013; 13 years ago
- Headquarters: International organization
- Leader: Stephen Curry, Imperial College London
- Website: sfdora.org

The San Francisco Declaration on Research Assessment (DORA) is a statement that denounces the practice of correlating the journal impact factor to the merits of a specific scientist's contributions. Also according to this statement, this practice creates biases and inaccuracies when appraising scientific research. It also states that the impact factor is not to be used as a substitute "measure of the quality of individual research articles, or in hiring, promotion, or funding decisions".

The declaration originated from the December 2012 meeting of the American Society for Cell Biology, and was published on May 13, 2013, signed by more than 150 scientists and 75 scientific organizations. The American Society for Cell Biology states that, as of 30 May 2013, there were more than 6,000 individual signatories to the declaration and that the number of scientific organizations "signing on has gone from 78 to 231" within two weeks. As of 14 December 2017, the number of individual signatories has risen to over 12,800 and the number of scientific organizations to 872. Some organization signatories in 2017 include the British Library, Nature Research, BioMed Central, Springer Open and Cancer Research UK.

DORA is also an organization whose mission is to "advance practical and robust approaches to research assessment globally and across all scholarly disciplines".

== Motivation ==
On 16 December 2012, a group of editors and publishers of academic journals gathered at the Annual Meeting of The American Society for Cell Biology in San Francisco to discuss current issues related to how the quality of research output is evaluated and how the primary scientific literature is cited.

The motivation behind the meeting was the consensus that impact factors for many cell biology journals do not accurately reflect the value to the cell biology community of the work published in these journals. The group therefore wanted to discuss how to better align measures of journal and article impact with journal quality.

All the above considerations also extend to other fields and the organizers consider DORA "a worldwide initiative covering all scholarly disciplines". In fact, the declaration has been signed by scientific associations with general scope (such as the American Association for the Advancement of Science and the Academy of Sciences of the Czech Republic), by more specialized associations working in fields quite removed from biology (such as the European Mathematical Society, Geological Society of London, and Linguistic Society of America), as well as by some universities and other general institutions (such as the Higher Education Funding Council for England).

The outcome of the meeting and further discussions was a set of recommendations that is referred to as the San Francisco Declaration on Research Assessment, published in May 2013.

== Signatories ==
As of 3 May 2021, 2203 organisations and 17,354 individuals had signed the declaration, including universities, research institutes, learned societies and funding bodies from around the world. On 20 May 2020 Springer Nature became the largest research publisher to sign the declaration.

== Implementation ==
In November 2019, Dutch universities and research funders announced the introduction of a new system of research recognition and reward, based on the DORA principles.

In November 2019, in the context of its roadmap for open science, the French national research agency CNRS announced the introduction of a system of individual assessment of researchers based on the DORA principles.

In March 2021, in the context of a reorganization, the university of Liverpool used the field-weighted citation-impact metric for determining which faculty jobs were at risk of being cut. This happened although that university was a signatory of DORA. This prompted the DORA organization, as well as the authors of the Leiden Manifesto, to contact the university for raising concerns.

In June 2021, Utrecht University announced that it would no longer use the impact factor in hiring and promotion decisions. This decision was partly inspired by the DORA declaration, which the university had signed in 2019.

== Activities of the organization ==
Demo of the Reformscape database developed by DORA

DORA is working on Project TARA (Tools to Advance Research Assessment), which aims to "facilitate the development of new policies and practices for academic career assessment".

As part of Project TARA, DORA has launched the database Reformscape, which collates policies on research assessment from research institutions.

== See also ==
- Goodhart's law
- Journal Citation Reports
- Scientific journal
