= Book Citation Index =

Online scientific citation indexing service

The Book Citation Index (BCI, BKCI) is an online subscription-based scientific citation indexing service for books maintained by Clarivate Analytics and is part of the Web of Science Core Collection. It was first launched in 2011 and indexes over 60,000 editorially selected books, starting from 2005. Books in the BCI are published electronically or in print and contain chapters and scholarly articles based on original research and/or reviews of such literature.

== Content ==
The index covers series and non-series books as long as they include full footnotes and the index has two separate editions, a Science edition and a Social Sciences & Humanities edition. The Science edition covers physics and chemistry, engineering, computing and technology, clinical medicine, life sciences, and agriculture and biology. Currently both series only contain books that date back to 2005.

== Reception ==
In their 2014 book Beyond Bibliometrics: Harnessing Multidimensional Indicators of Scholarly Impact, Blaise Cronin and Cassidy R. Sugimoto noted that "for impact assessment of book-based fields, bibliometricians need a database with large numbers of books" and that while the Book Citation Index did meet this need, Google Books also fulfilled this purpose and was not only free, but was (at the time) more comprehensive for bibliometric analyses. A 2013 article in the Journal of the American Society for Information Science and Technology remarked on the index's opportunities and limitations. It stated that the "most significant limitations to this potential application are the high share of publications without address information, the inflation of publication counts, the lack of cumulative citation counts from different hierarchical levels, and inconsistency in citation counts between the cited reference search and the book citation index." They also stated that the Book Citation Index was "a first step toward creating a reliable and necessary citation data source for monographs — a very challenging issue, because, unlike journals and conference proceedings, books have specific requirements, and several problems emerge not only in the context of subject classification, but also in their role as cited publications and in citing publications."
