= CiteScore =

Metric of academic journal importance

CiteScore (CS) of an academic journal is a measure reflecting the yearly average number of citations to recent articles published in that journal. It is produced by Elsevier, based on the citations recorded in the Scopus database. Absolute rankings and percentile ranks are also reported for each journal in a given subject area.

This journal evaluation metric was launched in December 2016 as an alternative to the Journal Citation Reports (JCR) impact factor (IF), calculated by Clarivate. CiteScore is based on the citations collected for articles published in the preceding four years, instead of two or five in the JCR IF. This enhanced methodology was introduced with the release of CiteScore 2019 in June 2020. At launch, CiteScore's neutrality was questioned by bibliometrics experts like Carl Bergstrom, who found it appeared to favour Elsevier's titles over Nature's.

== Calculation ==
In any given year, the CiteScore of a journal is the number of citations, received in that year and in previous three years, for documents published in the journal during the total period (four years), divided by the total number of published documents (articles, reviews, conference papers, book chapters, and data papers) in the journal during the same four-year period:

$\text{CS}_{y} = {\text{Citations}_{y}+\text{Citations}_{y-1}+\text{Citations}_{y-2}+\text{Citations}_{y-3}\over \text{Publications}_{y} + \text{Publications}_{y-1} + \text{Publications}_{y-2} + \text{Publications}_{y-3}}$

For example, Nature had a CiteScore 2021 of 70.2:

$\text{CS}_{2021} = {\text{Citations}_{2021} + \text{Citations}_{2020} + \text{Citations}_{2019} + \text{Citations}_{2018} \over \text{Publications}_{2021} + \text{Publications}_{2020} + \text{Publications}_{2019} + \text{Publications}_{2018}} = {338611 \over 4823 } = 70.2$

For example, the 2017 CiteScores were reported first in 2018 when all data was available completely. CiteScores are typically released in late May, approximately one month earlier than the JCR impact factors. Scopus also provides the projected CiteScores for the next year, which are updated every month.

=== Pre-2020 formula ===
Before 2020, the score was calculated differently: in a given year, the CiteScore of a journal was the number of citations received in that year of articles published in that journal during the three preceding years, divided by the total number of "citable items" published in that journal during the three preceding years:

$\text{CS}_{y} = {\text{Citations}_{y}\over \text{Publications}_{y-1} + \text{Publications}_{y-2} + \text{Publications}_{y-3}}$

For example, Nature had a CiteScore of 14.456 in 2017:

$\text{CS}_{2017} = {\text{Citations}_{2017}\over \text{Publications}_{2016} + \text{Publications}_{2015} + \text{Publications}_{2014}} = {114639 \over 7860 } = 14.59$

Because the calculation method changed, knowing the calculation date is an important detail when comparing CiteScores. For example, the Nature CiteScore for 2017 calculated with the post-2020 method is 53.7.

== Comparison to JCR Impact Factor ==
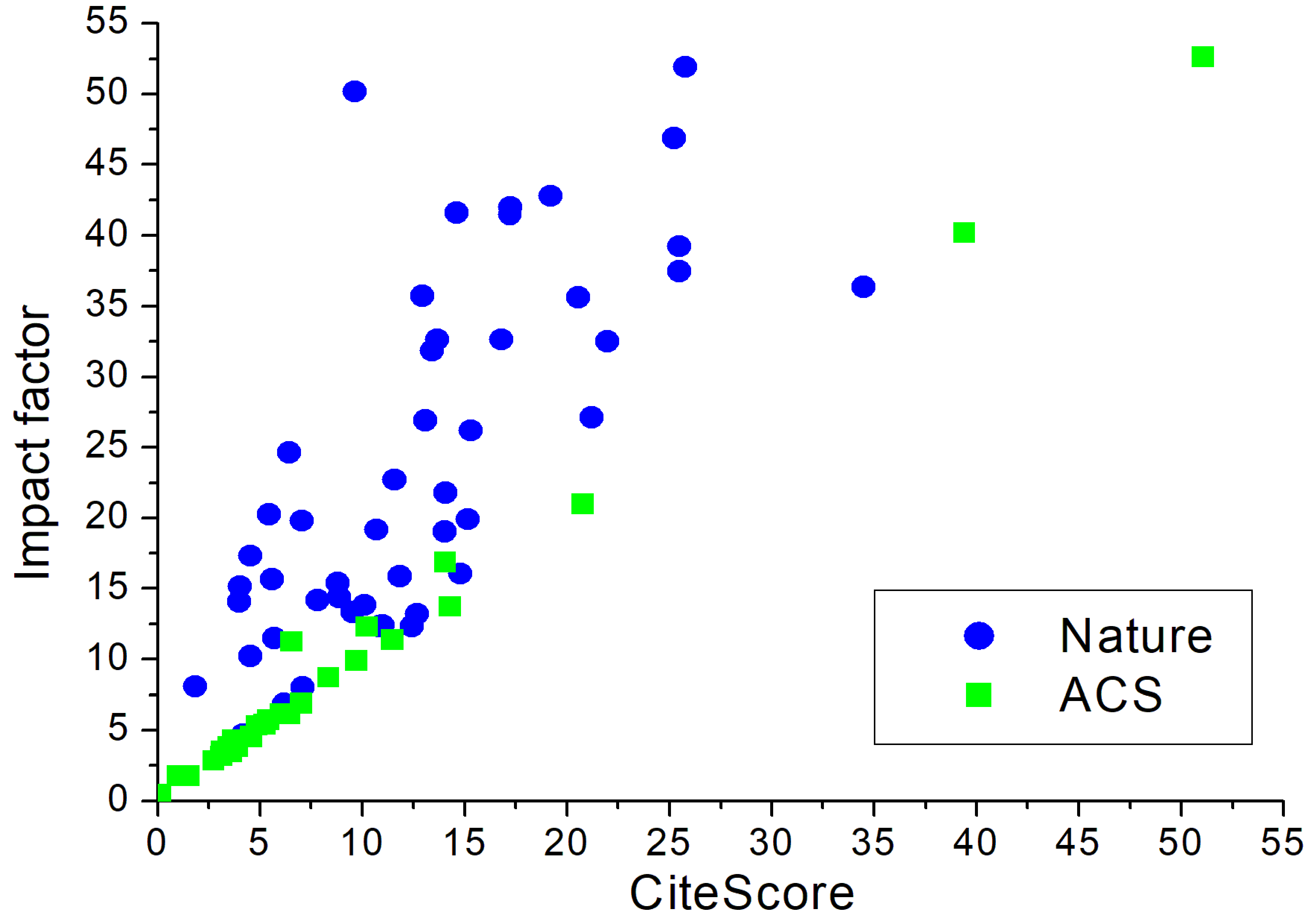
CiteScore vs. IF for American Chemical Society (ACS, green) and Nature group journals (blue), 2017 data. The values for Nature journals lie well above the expected ca. 1:1 linear dependence because those journals contain a significant fraction of editorials.

CiteScore was designed to compete with the two-year JCR impact factor, which is currently the most widely used journal metric. Their main differences are as follows:

Parameter	JCR IF	CiteScore
Evaluation period (years)	2	4
Database	JCR	Scopus
No. indexed journals (Mar 2022)	20,994	28,134 (Active Journals)
Access	Subscribers	Anyone
Evaluated items	Articles, reviews	Articles, Reviews, Conference Papers, Data Papers, Book chapters

Another difference is the definition of the "number of publications" or "citable items".
