= Scopus =

Dutch scientific search system

- Producer: Elsevier (Netherlands)
- History: 2004-present
- Languages: 40

Access
- Providers: Elsevier
- Cost: Subscription

Coverage
- Disciplines: Life sciences, Social sciences, Physical sciences, Health sciences
- Record depth: Index, abstract and citation indexing
- Format coverage: Articles, articles-in-press, books, chapters, conference papers, data papers, editorials, errata, letters, notes, patents, preprints, retracted articles, reviews, short surveys
- Temporal coverage: 1788-present
- Geospatial coverage: Worldwide
- No. of records: 100 million
- Update frequency: Daily

Print edition
- ISSN: 2588-9885

Links
- Website: www.scopus.com
- Title list(s): www.scopus.com/sources

Scopus is a Dutch scientific abstract and citation database, launched by the academic publisher Elsevier as a competitor to older Web of Science in 2004. The ensuing competition between the two databases has been characterized as "intense" and is considered to significantly benefit their users in terms of continuous improvement in coverage, search/analysis capabilities, but not in price. Free database The Lens completes the triad of main universal academic research databases.

Journals in Scopus are reviewed for sufficient quality each year according to four numerical measures: h-Index, CiteScore, SJR (SCImago Journal Rank) and SNIP (source normalized impact per paper). For this reason, the journals listed in Scopus are considered to meet the requirement for peer review quality established by several research grant agencies for their grant recipients and by degree-accreditation boards in a number of countries.

Scopus also allows patent searches from a dedicated patent database, Lexis-Nexis, albeit with limited functionality. At present, Scopus indexes the following patent databases: United States Patent and Trademark Office (USPTO); European Patent Office (EPO); Japan Patent Office (JPO): World Intellectual Property Organization (WIPO); UK Intellectual Property Office.

== Overview ==
Comparing ease of use and coverage of Scopus and the Web of Science (WoS), a 2006 study concluded that Scopus is "easy to navigate, even for the novice user.[...]The ability to search both forward and backward from a particular citation would be very helpful to the researcher. The multidisciplinary aspect allows the researcher to easily search outside of his discipline." and "One advantage of WOS over Scopus is the depth of coverage, with the full WOS database going back to 1945 and Scopus going back to 1966. However, Scopus and WOS complement each other as neither resource is all inclusive." A small number of studies found approximately an 80-90% overlap in coverage between WoS and Scopus for the period between 1990 and 2020.

In terms of the structured query language search capabilities Scopus is somewhat more advanced than Web of Science: for example, WoS can only search for words that appear close together (NEAR/n queries), which may return results such as "immunotherapy for cancer" or "cancer therapies"; Scopus can also search for words in a specific order (PRE/n queries), allowing more targeted results such as "cancer therapies" only.

Also, when the same article was covered in Scopus and in the Web of Science, its Scopus entry had a keyword ratio 3-5 of than its WoS counterpart, and the Scopus keywords are more focused on the specific article content, whereas WoS has more keywords related to the broad category of the article's subject. A larger number of narrow-targeted keywords allows Scopus users to find a larger number of relevant publications, while filtering out false positives. On the other hand, WoS exports (e.g. in the RIS format) the DOI numbers of cited articles, while Scopus exports the titles of cited articles. Also, Scopus allows exporting 20,000 references (e.g., as a RIS file) at once, while WoS export is limited to 5,000 references at once.

Scopus provides chemical search by CAS number and by chemical name, while WoS does not have these features. On the other hand, WoS has chemical structure search, but only a small number of publications are actually indexed for chemical structure searches. SciFinder is the preferred option for chemical searches in all cases.

Scopus also offers author profiles which cover affiliations, number of publications and their bibliographic data, references, and details on the number of citations each published document has received. It has alerting features that allow registered users to track changes to a profile and a facility to calculate authors' h-index. In 2016, a gratis website, Scopus CiteScore, was introduced. It provides citation data for all 25,000+ active titles such as journals, conference proceedings and books in Scopus and provides an alternative to the impact factor, a journal-level indicator which may correlate negatively with reliability.

Scopus IDs for individual authors can be integrated with the non-proprietary digital identifier ORCID.

In 2018, Scopus started embedding partial information about the open access status of works, using Unpaywall data. However, Scopus' RIS export files do not contain the information about Open Access status.

Several studies looked into the comparison of the number of publications indexed in the academic research databases. In a 2024 publication from the University of Jordan the publications from their university referenced in several databases were compared. The authors found, that the degree of coverage decreases in the order: Scopus, Web of Science, The Lens.

A 2024 study from Spain concluded that zero-cost The Lens, which combined the data from Crossref, PubMed, Core and OpenAlex, had the largest coverage, with more than 247 million bibliographic records. No-cost Open Alex had the second largest coverage of about 240 million publications in total. Free SciLit came in third with 149 million of publications agglomerated from Crossref, PubMed, preprint repositories and publishers. Web of Science Core Collection came in fourth with 85 million. records. Scopus was the fifth with 78 million records. While no database was comprehensive, the coverage overlap between any two databases was substantial.

A 2025 study from a medical university in China limited to scleral contact lenses concluded that Scopus had 3.6% more references than Web of Science.

== Content selection and advisory board ==
Since Elsevier is the owner of Scopus and is also one of the main international publishers of scientific journals, an independent and international Scopus Content Selection and advisory board (CSAB) was established in 2009 to prevent a potential conflict of interest in the choice of journals to be included in the database and to maintain an open and transparent content coverage policy, regardless of publisher. The board consists of scientists and subject librarians. Nevertheless, critique over a perceived conflict of interest has continued.

CSAB team is responsible for inclusion and exclusion of different titles on Scopus. The list of journals and books indexed in Scopus is updated 2 to 3 times per year. Each year Scopus receives around 3,500 submissions for new titles to be included and accepts approximately 25% of them. The re-evaluation policy is based on four criteria of Publication Concern, Under Performance, Outlier Performance and Continuous curation. Between 2004 and 2020, Scopus included 46,534 and excluded 688 titles Between 2016 and 2023, the CSAB has re-evaluated 990 titles published by 539 different publishers, leading to 536 titles discontinued for indexing. In 2024 Scopus covered around 28,000 active journals and nearly 300,000 books.

Nevertheless, research continues to show the inclusion of predatory journals.

While marketed as a global point of reference, Scopus and WoS have been characterised as "structurally biased against research produced in non-Western countries, non-English language research, and research from the arts, humanities, and social sciences".

== Derived citation metrics ==
=== CiteScore ===
CiteScore (CS) of an academic journal is a measure reflecting the yearly average number of citations to recent articles published in that journal. It is produced by Elsevier, based on the citations recorded in the Scopus database. Absolute rankings and percentile ranks are also reported for each journal in a given subject area.

This journal evaluation metric was launched in December 2016 as an alternative to the Journal Citation Reports (JCR) impact factor (IF), calculated by Clarivate. CiteScore is based on the citations collected for articles published in the preceding four years, instead of two or five in the JCR IF. This enhanced methodology was introduced with the release of CiteScore 2019 in June 2020. At launch, CiteScore's neutrality was questioned by bibliometrics experts like Carl Bergstrom, who found it appeared to favour Elsevier's titles over Nature's.

=== SCImago Journal Rank ===
The SCImago Journal Rank (SJR) indicator is a measure of the prestige of scholarly journals that accounts for both the number of citations received by a journal and the prestige of the journals where the citations come from.

== See also ==
- Journalology
- List of academic databases and search engines
