= Journal Citation Reports =

Annual publication covering academic journals

Journal Citation Reports (JCR) is an annual publication by Clarivate. It has been integrated with the Web of Science and is accessed from the Web of Science Core Collection. It provides information about academic journals in the natural and social sciences, including impact factors. JCR was originally published as a part of the Science Citation Index. Into the 21st century, the JCR, as a distinct service, is based on citations compiled from the Science Citation Index Expanded and the Social Sciences Citation Index. As of the 2023 edition, journals from the Arts and Humanities Citation Index and the Emerging Sources Citation Index have also been included.

== Basic journal information ==
The information given for each journal includes:

- the basic bibliographic information of publisher, title abbreviation, language, ISSN
- the subject categories (there are 254 subject categories in the 2022 edition)

== Citation information ==
- Basic citation data:
  - the number of articles published during that year and
  - the number of times the articles in the journal were cited during the year by later articles in itself and other journals,
- detailed tables showing
  - the number of times the articles in the journal were cited during the year by later articles in itself and other journals,
  - the number of citations made from articles published in the journal that year to it and other specific individual journals during each of the most recent ten years (the 20 journals most cited are included)
  - the number of times articles published in the journal during each of the most recent 10 years were cited by individual specific journals during the year (the twenty journals with the greatest number of citations are given)
- and several measures derived from these data for a given journal: its impact factor, immediacy index, etc.

There are separate editions for the sciences and the social sciences; the 2013 science edition includes 8,411 journals, and the 2012 social science edition contains 3,016 titles. The issue for each year is published the following year after the citations for the year have been published and the information processed. The publication is available online (JCR on the Web), or in CD format (JCR on CD-ROM); it was originally published in print, with the detailed tables on microfiche. In general, various universities, administrative centers and ministries in charge of higher education make their evaluations of university professors and other researchers on the number and quality of articles published in journals indexed in the JCR.

== Release schedule ==
In recent years, it has often been released in mid-June. The 2017 Journal Citation Reports, based on 2016 data, was released on 14 June 2017.

== Integrations ==
In April 2020, Journal Citation Reports included a beta for open access data, which uses Unpaywall data. It officially left the beta phase with the release of the 2020 JCR in June 2020.

== Impact factor ==
The impact factor (IF) or journal impact factor (JIF) of an academic journal is a type of journal ranking. The impact factor of a journal reflects the yearly mean number of article citations published in the last two years, calculated by dividing the number of citations received by articles published in a journal for a given year divided by the number of articles published in that period. For example, an impact factor of 41 in 2017 indicates that the average number of citations received by an article published in that journal in 2017 was 41.

Journals with higher impact-factor values are considered more prestigious or important within their field. Impact factor is a scientometric index calculated by Clarivate's Web of Science. While frequently used by universities and funding bodies to decide on promotion and research proposals, it has been criticised for distorting good scientific practices. The metric cannot effectively compare journals in different disciplines, as the number of citations an article receives and when they are received (the first year after publication compared to the second year and beyond) can vary widely depending on the subject. The IF's continued widespread use has been ascribed to its ease of calculation rather than any perceived usefulness in assessing journal quality.

== See also ==
- Journal metrics
- Scopus
