= Academic journal =

Peer-reviewed scholarly periodical

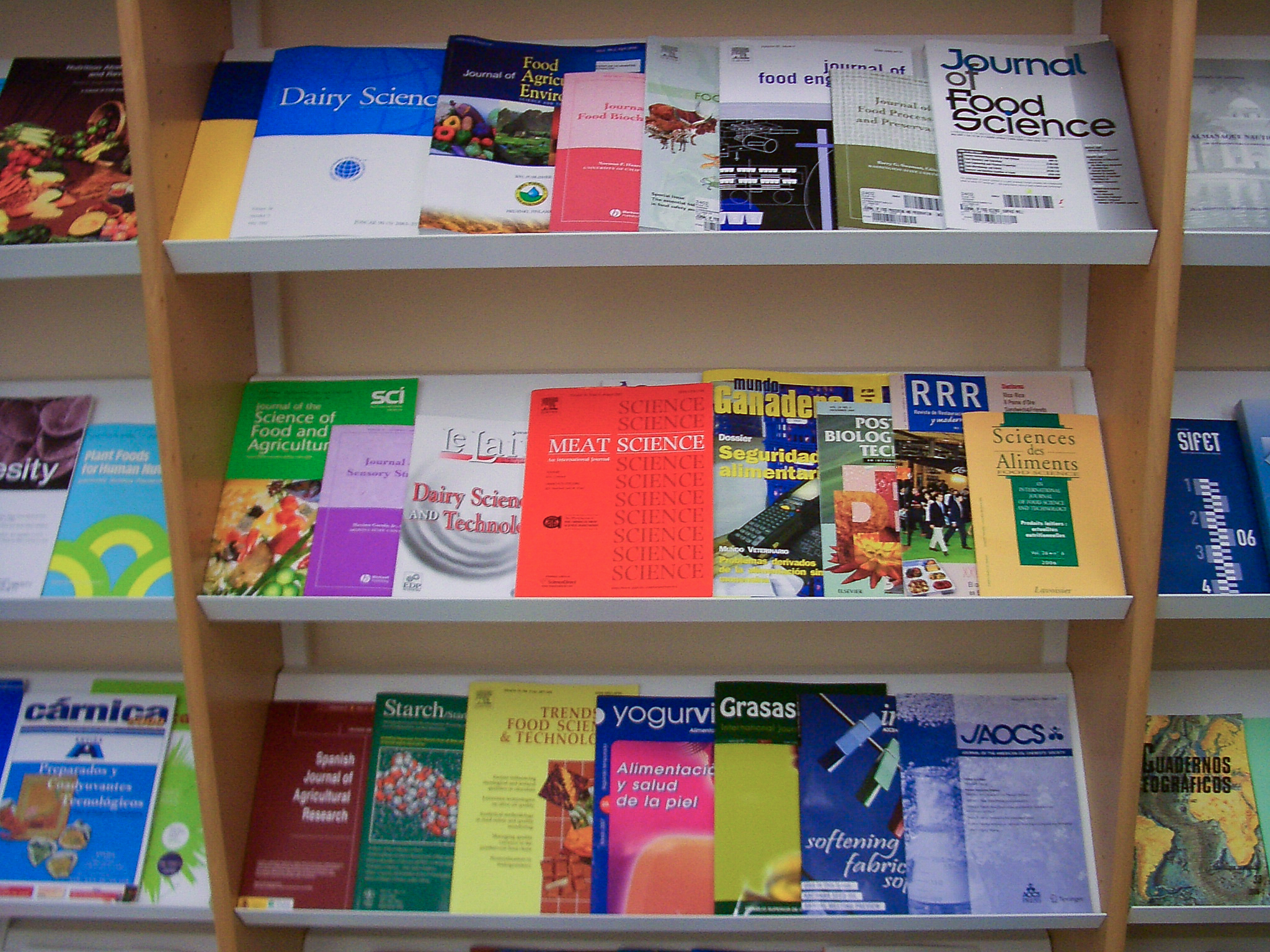
There are different types of peer-reviewed research journals; these specific publications are about food science.

An academic journal or scholarly journal is a periodical publication in which scholarship relating to a particular academic discipline is published. They serve as permanent and transparent forums for the dissemination, scrutiny, and discussion of research. Unlike professional magazines or trade magazines, the articles are mostly written by researchers rather than staff writers employed by the journal. They nearly universally require peer review for research articles or other scrutiny from contemporaries competent and established in their respective fields. Academic journals trace their origins back to the 17th century, with the Philosophical Transactions of the Royal Society being established in 1665 as the first scientific journal.

As of 2012, it is estimated that over 28,100 active academic journals are in publication, with scopes ranging from the general sciences, as seen in journals like Science and Nature, to highly specialized fields. These journals publish a variety of articles including original research, review articles, and perspectives. The advent of electronic publishing has made academic journals more accessible.

== Content ==
Content usually takes the form of articles presenting original research, review articles, or book reviews. The purpose of an academic journal, according to Henry Oldenburg (the first editor of Philosophical Transactions of the Royal Society), is to give researchers a venue to "impart their knowledge to one another, and contribute what they can to the Grand design of improving natural knowledge, and perfecting all Philosophical Arts, and Sciences."

The term academic journal applies to scholarly publications in all fields; this includes journals that cover formal sciences, natural sciences, social sciences, and humanities, which differ somewhat from each other in form and function. Academic journals in the formal and natural sciences are often called scientific journals. Most journals are highly specialized, although some of the oldest journals such as Science and Nature publish articles and scientific papers across a wide range of scientific fields.

Although academic journals are superficially similar to professional magazines (or trade journals), they are quite different. Articles in academic journals are written by active researchers such as students, scientists, and professors. Their intended audience is others in the field, meaning their content is highly technical. Academic articles also deal with research and are peer-reviewed. Meanwhile, trade journals are aimed at people in different fields, focusing on how people in those fields can do their jobs better.

Active academic researchers are expected to publish their work in academic journals, and public funding bodies often require research results to be published in academic journals. Academic credentials for promotion into academic ranks are established in large part by the number and impact of scientific articles published. This places pressure on researchers to publish articles frequently – an environment known as publish or perish.

== History ==
Adrien Auzout's "A TABLE of the Apertures of Object-Glasses" from a 1665 article in Philosophical Transactions, showing a table

In the 17th century, scientists wrote letters to each other and included scientific ideas with them. Then, in the mid-17th century, scientists began to hold meetings and share their scientific ideas. Eventually, they led to the start of organizations, such as the Royal Society (1660) and the French Academy of Sciences (1666).

The idea of a published journal with the purpose of "[letting] people know what is happening in the Republic of Letters" was first conceived by François Eudes de Mézeray in 1663. A publication titled Journal littéraire général was supposed to be published to fulfill that goal, but never was. Humanist scholar Denis de Sallo (under the pseudonym "Sieur de Hédouville") and printer Jean Cusson took Mazerai's idea, and obtained a royal privilege from King Louis XIV on 8 August 1664 to establish the Journal des sçavans. The journal's first issue was published on 5 January 1665. It was aimed at people of letters, and had four main objectives:

1. review newly published major European books,
2. publish the obituaries of famous people,
3. report on discoveries in arts and science, and
4. report on the proceedings and censures of both secular and ecclesiastical courts, as well as those of universities both in France and outside.

Soon after, the Royal Society established Philosophical Transactions of the Royal Society in March 1665, and the Académie des Sciences established the Mémoires de l'Académie des Sciences in 1666, which focused on scientific communications. By the end of the 18th century, nearly 500 such periodicals had been published, the vast majority coming from Germany (304 periodicals), France (53), and England (34). Several of those publications, in particular the German journals, tended to be short-lived (under five years). A.J. Meadows has estimated the proliferation of journals to reach 10,000 journals in 1950, and 71,000 in 1987. Michael Mabe wrote that the estimates will vary depending on the definition of what exactly counts as a scholarly publication, but that the growth rate has been "remarkably consistent over time", with an average rate of 3.46% per year from 1800 to 2003.

In 1733, Medical Essays and Observations was established by the Medical Society of Edinburgh as the first fully peer-reviewed journal. Peer review was introduced as an attempt to increase the quality and pertinence of submissions. Other important events in the history of academic journals include the establishment of Nature (1869) and Science (1880), the establishment of Postmodern Culture in 1990 as the first online-only journal, the foundation of arXiv in 1991 for the dissemination of preprints to be discussed before publication in a journal, and the establishment of PLOS One in 2006 as the first megajournal.

Peer review did not begin until the 1970s, and was seen as a way of enabling researchers who were not as well-known to have their papers published in journals that were more prestigious. Though it was originally done by mailing copies of papers to reviewers, it is now done online.

== Scholarly articles ==
There are two kinds of article or paper submissions in academia: solicited, where an individual has been invited to submit work either through direct contact or through a general submissions call, and unsolicited, where an individual submits a work for potential publication without directly being asked to do so. Upon receipt of a submitted article, editors at the journal determine whether to reject the submission outright or begin the process of peer review. In the latter case, the submission becomes subject to review by outside scholars of the editor's choosing who typically remain anonymous. The number of these peer reviewers (or "referees") varies according to each journal's editorial practice – typically, no fewer than two, though sometimes three or more, experts in the subject matter of the article produce reports upon the content, style, and other factors, which inform the editors' publication decisions.

Though these reports are generally confidential, some journals and publishers also practice public peer review. The editors either choose to reject the article, ask for a revision and resubmission, or accept the article for publication. Even accepted articles are often subjected to further (sometimes considerable) editing by journal editorial staff before they appear in print. The peer review can take from several weeks to several months.

Many journal articles are broadly structured according to the IMRAD scheme. Each article has several sections, often including the following:

- The title;
- Information about the author(s);
- The abstract, which is a one-paragraph summary of the article;
- The introduction, including a background, why the research was done, research on this topic that has been done before, and (possibly) a hypothesis;
- The methodology or method, which includes the way the research was done, details concerning the study's sample, measures for assessment, and the procedure;
- Findings or results, which summarize what the study found;
- Conclusion, comments, or discussion, which both explain how the results answered the questions that were posed, as well as areas that could be researched in the future;
- A list of works that the article's author cited.

Reading an article in an academic journal usually entails first reading the title, to see if it is related to the desired topic. If it is, the next step is to read the abstract (or summary or conclusion, if the abstract is missing), to determine if the article is worth reading.

Publishing research results is an essential part of helping science to advance. If scientists are describing experiments or calculations, they should also explain how they did them so that an independent researcher could repeat the experiment or calculation to verify the results, or so that they could evaluate whatever the research article's findings were. Each journal article becomes part of the permanent scientific record.

=== Types of article ===
Articles can also be categorized by their purpose. The exact terminology and definitions vary by field and specific journal, but often include:

- Letters (also called communications, and not to be confused with letters to the editor) are short descriptions of important current research findings that are usually fast-tracked for immediate publication because they are considered urgent.
- Research notes are short descriptions of current research findings that are considered less urgent or important than Letters.
- Articles are usually between five and twenty pages and are complete descriptions of current original research findings, but there are considerable variations between different fields and journals—80-page articles are not rare in mathematics or theoretical computer science.
- Supplemental articles contain a large volume of tabular data that is the result of current research and may be dozens or hundreds of pages with mostly numerical data. Some journals now only publish this data electronically on the Internet. Supplemental information also contains other voluminous material not appropriate for the main body of the article, like descriptions of routine procedures, derivations of equations, source code, non-essential data, spectra or other such miscellaneous information.
- A target article in a journal argues a case, to which other authors submit a commentary or a response. There may be a final response from the author of the target article. See, for example, Alison Gopnik's article How we know our minds: The illusion of first-person knowledge of intentionality in the journal Behavioral and Brain Sciences, Volume 16, Issue 1 (1993), which was one of a pair of "target articles" to which other responses were published in the same volume.
- Review articles do not cover original research but rather accumulate the results of many different articles on a particular topic into a coherent narrative about the state of the art in that field. Review articles provide information about the topic and also provide journal references to the original research. Reviews may be entirely narrative, or may provide quantitative summary estimates resulting from the application of meta-analytical methods.
- Data papers are articles dedicated to describe datasets. This type of article is becoming popular and journals exclusively dedicated to them have been established, e.g. Scientific Data and Earth System Science Data.
- Video papers are a recent addition to practice of academic publications. They most often combine an online video demonstration of a new technique or protocol with a rigorous textual description.

== Reviewing ==
=== Review articles ===
Review articles, also called "reviews of progress", are checks on the research published in journals. Some journals are devoted entirely to review articles, some contain a few in each issue, and others do not publish review articles. Such reviews often cover the research from the preceding year, some for longer or shorter terms; some are devoted to specific topics, some to general surveys. Some reviews are enumerative, listing all significant articles in a given subject; others are selective, including only what they think worthwhile. Yet others are evaluative, judging the state of progress in the subject field. Some journals are published in series, each covering a complete subject field year, or covering specific fields through several years.

Unlike original research articles, review articles tend to be solicited or "peer-invited" submissions, often planned years in advance, which may themselves go through a peer-review process once received. They are typically relied upon by students beginning a study in a given field, or for current awareness of those already in the field.

=== Book reviews ===
Reviews of scholarly books are checks upon the research books published by scholars; unlike articles, book reviews tend to be solicited. Journals typically have a separate book review editor determining which new books to review and by whom. If an outside scholar accepts the book review editor's request for a book review, he or she generally receives a free copy of the book from the journal in exchange for a timely review. Publishers send books to book review editors in the hope that their books will be reviewed. The length and depth of research book reviews varies much from journal to journal, as does the extent of textbook and trade book review.

== Prestige and ranking ==
An academic journal's prestige is established over time, and can reflect many factors, some but not all of which are expressible quantitatively. In many fields, a formal or informal hierarchy of academic journals exists; the most prestigious journal in a field tends to be the most selective in terms of the articles it will select for publication, and usually will also have the highest impact factor. In some countries, journal rankings can be utilized for funding decisions and even evaluation of individual researchers, although they are poorly suited for that purpose.

In each academic discipline, some journals receive a high number of submissions and opt to restrict how many they publish, keeping the acceptance rate low. Size or prestige are not a guarantee of reliability.

In the natural sciences and in the social sciences, the impact factor is an established proxy, measuring the number of later articles citing articles already published in the journal. There are other quantitative measures of prestige, such as the overall number of citations, how quickly articles are cited, and the average "half-life" of articles. Clarivate Analytics' Journal Citation Reports, which among other features, computes an impact factor for academic journals, draws data for computation from the Science Citation Index Expanded (for natural science journals), and from the Social Sciences Citation Index (for social science journals). Several other metrics are also used, including the SCImago Journal Rank, CiteScore, Eigenfactor, and Altmetrics.

In the Anglo-American humanities, there is no tradition (as there is in the sciences) of giving impact factors that could be used in establishing a journal's prestige. Recent moves have been made by the European Science Foundation (ESF) to change the situation, resulting in the publication of preliminary lists for the ranking of academic journals in the humanities. These rankings have been severely criticized, notably by history and sociology of science British journals that have published a common editorial entitled "Journals under Threat". Though it did not prevent ESF and some national organizations from proposing journal rankings, it largely prevented their use as evaluation tools.

In some disciplines such as knowledge management/intellectual capital, the lack of a well-established journal ranking system is perceived by academics as "a major obstacle on the way to tenure, promotion and achievement recognition". Conversely, a significant number of scientists and organizations consider the pursuit of impact factor calculations as inimical to the goals of science, and have signed the San Francisco Declaration on Research Assessment to limit its use.

Three categories of techniques have developed to assess journal quality and create journal rankings:

- stated preference;
- revealed preference; and
- publication power approaches

== Costs ==
Many academic journals are subsidized by universities or professional organizations, and do not exist to make a profit. They often accept advertising, page and image charges from authors to pay for production costs. On the other hand, some journals are produced by commercial publishers who do make a profit by charging subscriptions to individuals and libraries. They may also sell all of their journals in discipline-specific collections or a variety of other packages. Many scientists and librarians have long protested these costs, especially as they see these payments going to large for-profit publishing houses. To allow their researchers online access to journals, many universities purchase site licenses, permitting access from anywhere in the university, and, with appropriate authorization, by university-affiliated users at home or elsewhere. These may be much more expensive than the cost for a print subscription. Despite the transition to electronic publishing, the costs of site licenses continue to rise relative to universities' budgets. This is known as the serials crisis.

Journal editors tend to have other professional responsibilities, most often as teaching professors. In the case of the largest journals, there are paid staff assisting in the editing. The production of the journals is almost always done by publisher-paid staff. Humanities and social science academic journals are usually subsidized by universities or professional organization.

Traditional scientific journals require a paid subscription to access published articles.

The cost and value proposition of subscription to academic journals is being continuously reassessed by institutions worldwide. In the context of the big deal cancellations by several library systems in the world, data analysis tools like Unpaywall Journals are used by libraries to estimate the specific cost and value of the various options: libraries can avoid subscriptions for materials already served by instant open access via open archives like PubMed Central.

Concerns about cost and open access have led to the creation of free-access journals such as the Public Library of Science (PLoS) family and partly open or reduced-cost journals such as the Journal of High Energy Physics. However, professional editors still have to be paid, and PLoS still relies heavily on donations from foundations to cover the majority of its operating costs; smaller journals do not often have access to such resources. Open access journals may charge authors a fee for review or publication, rather than charging readers an access fee.

== Reproducibility and replicability ==
For scientific journals, reproducibility and replicability of the scientific results are core concepts that allow other scientists to check and reproduce the results under the same conditions described in the paper or at least similar conditions and produce similar results with similar measurements of the same subject or carried out under changed conditions of measurement. While the ability to reproduce the results based only on details included in the article is expected, verification of reproducibility by a third party is not generally required for publication. The reproducibility of results presented in an article is therefore judged implicitly by the quality of the procedures reported and agreement with the data provided. However, some journals in the field of chemistry such as Inorganic Syntheses and Organic Syntheses require independent reproduction of the results presented as part of the review process.

The inability for independent researchers to reproduce published results is widespread, with 70% of researchers reporting failure to reproduce another scientist's results, including more than half who report failing to reproduce their own experiments. Sources of irreproducibility vary, including publication of falsified or misrepresented data and poor detailing of procedures.

== Copyright ==
Traditionally, the author of an article was required to transfer the copyright to the journal publisher. Publishers claimed this was necessary in order to protect authors' rights, and to coordinate permissions for reprints or other use. However, many authors, especially those active in the open access movement, found this unsatisfactory, and have used their influence to effect a gradual move towards a license to publish instead. Under such a system, the publisher has permission to edit, print, and distribute the article commercially, but the authors retain the other rights themselves.

Even if they retain the copyright to an article, most journals allow certain rights to their authors. These rights usually include the ability to reuse parts of the paper in the author's future work, and allow the author to distribute a limited number of copies. In the print format, such copies are called reprints; in the electronic format, they are called postprints. Some publishers, for example the American Physical Society, also grant the author the right to post and update the article on the author's or employer's website and on free e-print servers, to grant permission to others to use or reuse figures, and even to reprint the article as long as no fee is charged. The rise of open access journals, in which the author retains the copyright but must pay a publication charge, such as the Public Library of Science family of journals, is another recent response to copyright concerns.

== New developments ==
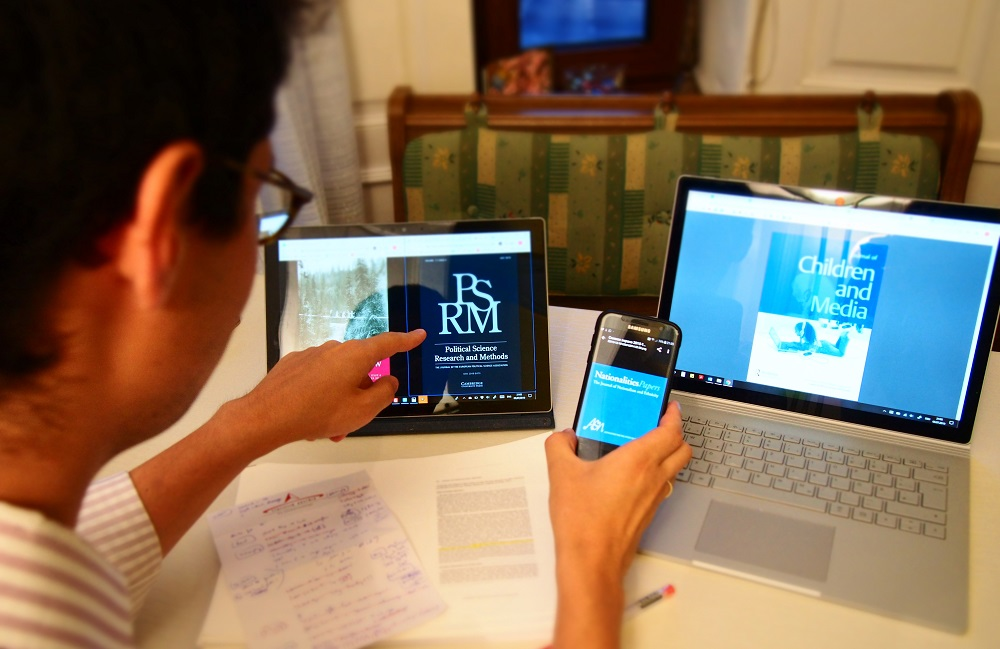
In the 21st century, journals are commonly accessed digitally.

The Internet has revolutionized the production of, and access to, academic journals, with their contents available online via services subscribed to by academic libraries. Individual articles are subject-indexed in databases such as Google Scholar. Some of the smallest, most specialized journals are prepared in-house, by an academic department, and published only online – this has sometimes been in the blog format, though some, like the open access journal Internet Archaeology, use the medium to embed searchable datasets, 3D models, and interactive mapping.

Currently, there is a movement in higher education encouraging open access, either via self archiving, whereby the author deposits a paper in a disciplinary or institutional repository where it can be searched for and read, or via publishing it in a free open access journal, which does not charge for subscriptions, being either subsidized or financed by a publication fee. Given the goal of sharing scientific research to speed advances, open access has affected science journals more than humanities journals. Commercial publishers are experimenting with open access models, but are trying to protect their subscription revenues.

Academic journals have been criticized for persistent gender, geographic, and other representation imbalances on editorial boards.

=== Predatory and junk journals ===
The much lower entry cost of online publishing has also raised concerns of an increase in publication of "junk" journals with lower publishing standards. These journals, often with names chosen as similar to well-established publications, solicit articles via e-mail and then charge the author to publish an article, often with no sign of actual review. Jeffrey Beall, a research librarian at the University of Colorado, has compiled a list of what he considers to be "potential, possible, or probable predatory scholarly open-access publishers"; the list numbered over 300 journals as of April 2013, but he estimates that there may be thousands. The OMICS Publishing Group, which publishes a number of the journals on this list, threatened to sue Beall in 2013 and Beall stopped publishing in 2017, citing pressure from his university. A US judge fined OMICS $50 million in 2019 stemming from an FTC lawsuit.

Some academic journals use the registered report format, which aims to counteract issues such as data dredging and hypothesizing after the results are known. For example, Nature Human Behaviour has adopted the registered report format, as it "shift[s] the emphasis from the results of research to the questions that guide the research and the methods used to answer them". The European Journal of Personality defines this format: "In a registered report, authors create a study proposal that includes theoretical and empirical background, research questions/hypotheses, and pilot data (if available). Upon submission, this proposal will then be reviewed before data collection, and if accepted, the paper resulting from this peer-reviewed procedure will be published, regardless of the study outcomes."

=== Electronic journals ===
Some journals are born digital in that they are solely published on the web and in a digital format. Though most electronic journals originated as print journals, which subsequently evolved to have an electronic version, while still maintaining a print component, others eventually became electronic-only.

An e-journal closely resembles a print journal in structure: there is a table of contents which lists the articles, and many electronic journals still use a volume/issue model, although some titles now publish continuously. Online journal articles are a specialized form of electronic document: they have the purpose of providing material for academic research and study, and they are formatted approximately like journal articles in traditional printed journals. Often, a journal article will be available for download in two formats: PDF and HTML, although other electronic file types are often supported for supplementary material. New tools such as JATS and Utopia Documents provide a 'bridge' to the 'web-versions' in that they connect the content in PDF versions directly to the World Wide Web via hyperlinks that are created 'on-the-fly'. The PDF version of an article is usually seen as the version of record, but the matter is subject to some debate. Articles are indexed in bibliographic databases as well as by search engines. E-journals allow new types of content to be included in journals, for example, video material, or the data sets on which research has been based.

With the growth and development of the Internet, there has been a growth in the number of new digital-only journals. A subset of these journals exist as Open Access titles, meaning that they are free to access for all, and have Creative Commons licences which permit the reproduction of content in different ways. High quality open access journals are listed in Directory of Open Access Journals. Most, however, continue to exist as subscription journals, for which libraries, organisations and individuals purchase access.

Benefits of electronically publishing include easy availability of supplementary materials (data, graphics and video), lower cost, and availability to more people, especially scientists from non-developed countries. Hence, research results from more developed nations are becoming more accessible to scientists from non-developed countries.

== Lists ==
- Databases providing detailed information about journals:
  - Ulrich's Global Serials Directory
  - Directory of Periodicals by Modern Language Association
  - JournalSeek by Genamics
  - Web of Science
  - Scopus
  - WorldCat
  - OpenAlex
- Journal hosting sites that also provide lists. Some sites evaluate journals, providing information such as how long a journal takes to review articles and what types of articles it publishes: (Note: For example the Reviews of Peer-Reviewed Journals in the Humanities and Social Sciences)
  - Project MUSE
  - JSTOR
  - ScienceDirect
  - Informaworld

== See also ==
- Academic conference
- Academic writing
- Citation index
- Journalology
- Journal club
- Thesis
  - Collection of articles
- Treatise
