= Saposin protein domain =

Saposin A-type domain

Identifiers
- Symbol: SapA
- Pfam: PF02199
- InterPro: IPR003119
- PROSITE: PDOC51110
Available protein structures:
- PDB: IPR003119 PF02199 (ECOD; PDBsum)
- AlphaFold: IPR003119; PF02199

Saposin-like type B, region 1 (SapB1)
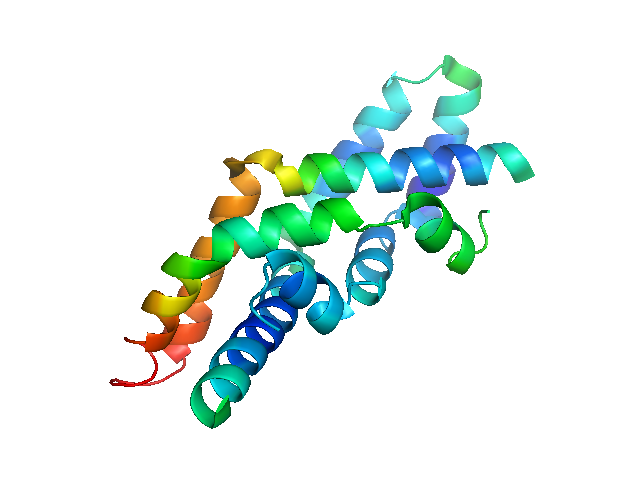
- Crystal structure of human saposin C dimer in an open conformation.

Identifiers
- Symbol: SapB_1
- Pfam: PF05184
- InterPro: IPR007856
- PROSITE: PDOC50015
Available protein structures:
- PDB: IPR007856 PF05184 (ECOD; PDBsum)
- AlphaFold: IPR007856; PF05184

Saposin-like type B, region 2 (SapB2)

Identifiers
- Symbol: SapB_2
- Pfam: PF03489
- InterPro: IPR008138
- PROSITE: PDOC50015
- CATH: 1qdmC03
- SCOP2: 1nkl / SCOPe / SUPFAM
- OPM superfamily: 76
- OPM protein: 1sn6
Available protein structures:
- PDB: IPR008138 PF03489 (ECOD; PDBsum)
- AlphaFold: IPR008138; PF03489

The saposin domains refers to two evolutionally-conserved protein domains found in saposin and related proteins (SAPLIP). Saposins are small lysosomal proteins that serve as activators of various lysosomal lipid-degrading enzymes. They probably act by isolating the lipid substrate from the membrane surroundings, thus making it more accessible to the soluble degradative enzymes. All mammalian saposins are synthesized as a single precursor molecule (prosaposin) which contains four Saposin-B domains, yielding the active saposins after proteolytic cleavage, and two Saposin-A domains that are removed in the activation reaction.

The Saposin-B domains also occur in other proteins, most of them playing a role in interacting with membranes.

== Classification ==
The saposin (SapB1-SapB2) domains are found in a wide range of proteins. Each half-domain encodes two alpha helices in the SapB domain for a total of four.

The mamallian prosaposin (domain organization below) is a prototypic family member. It also includes the N- and C-terminal SapA domains, both of which are proteolyticly cleaved as the proprotein matures. Four connected pairs of SapB1-SapB2 domains are released, sequentially named Saposin-A through D. Some closely related proteins, such as PSAPL1 and SFTPB, share the architecture and the cleaving mechanism in whole or in part. While Prosaposin and PSAPL1 act in lysosomal lipid degradation, SFTPB is released into the pulmonary surfactant, playing a role in rearranging lipids.

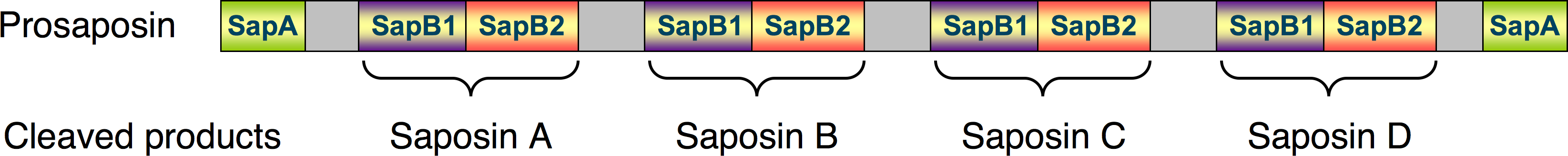
primary structure schematic of prosaposin.

However, proteins like GNLY and AOAH do not carry a SapA domain. While GNLY is essentially a SapB with N-terminal extensions specialized for lysing pathogen cell membranes, the ADAH protein uses the uncleaved SapB domain for targeting the correct intracellular compartment.

The plant-specific insert is an unusual variation on the SapB domains. It features a circular permutation compared to the usual topology: instead of featuring a SapB1-SapB2 unit, it is made up of a SapB2-linker-SapB1 unit seemingly derived by taking a half of each of two SapB units.

== Human proteins containing this domain ==
- AOAH
- GNLY
- Prosaposin
- PSAPL1
- SFTPB
