= Plant-specific insert =

Solanum tuberosum Aspartic Protease 3 Plant-Specific Insert
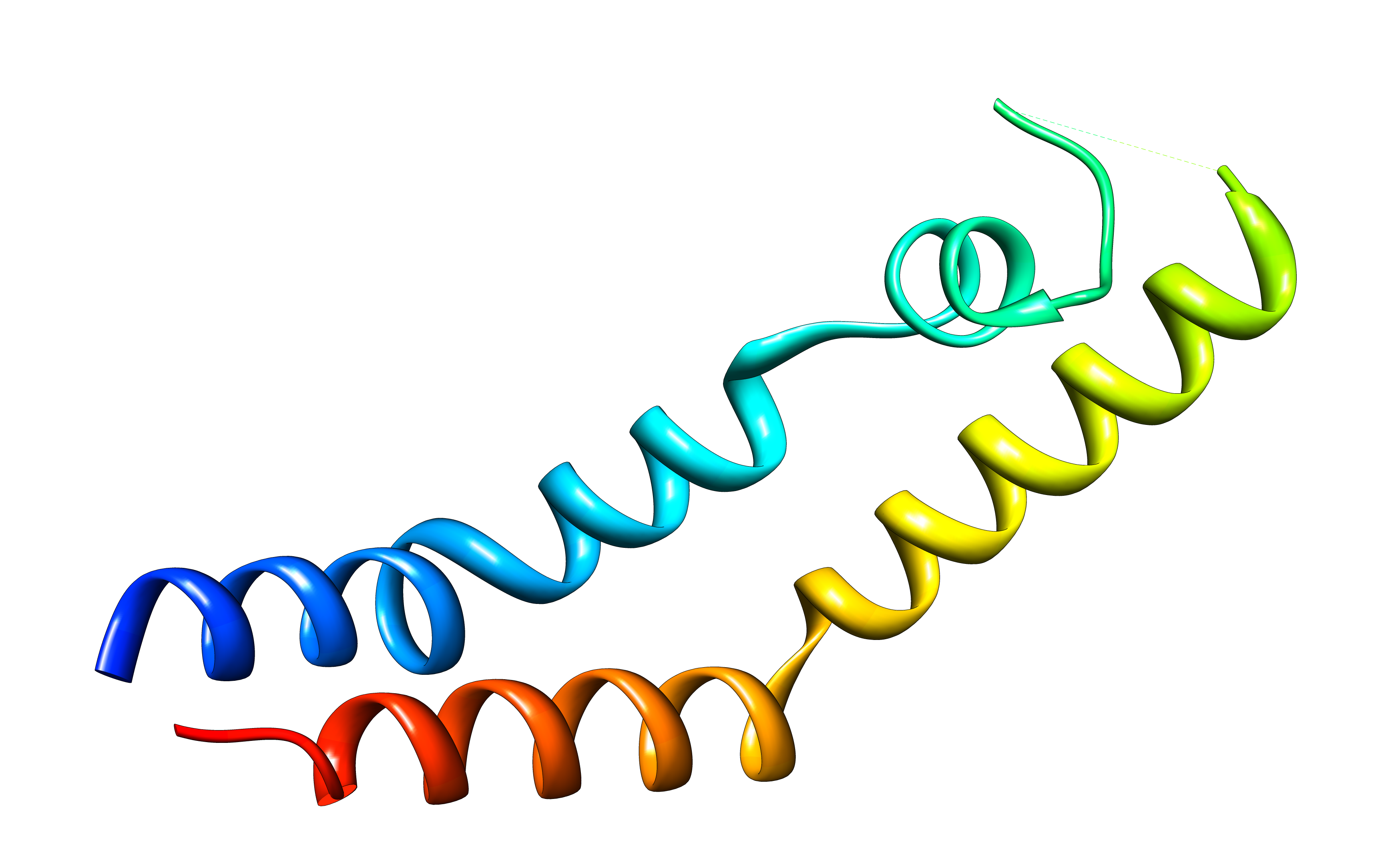
- Structure of the saposin-like domain of a plant aspartic proteinase

Identifiers
- Organism: Solanum tuberosum
- Symbol: StAP_PSI
- PDB: 3RFI
- UniProt: Q6B9W9
Search for
- Structures: Swiss-model
- Domains: InterPro

The plant-specific insert (PSI) or plant-specific sequence (PSS) is an independent domain, exclusively found in plants, consisting of approximately 100 residues, found on the C-terminal lobe on some aspartic proteases (AP) called phytepsins. The PSI, as an independent entity separate from its parent AP, is homologous to saposin and belongs to the saposin-like protein family (SAPLIP).

Although the PSI is grouped along proteins in the SAPLIP family, the PSI does not contain a proper saposin-like domain. This is due to a circular permutation of the N- and C-termini of the PSI, in which the termini are "swapped". This has led to the PSI being termed a "swaposin" (a play-on-words of "swap" and "saposin") although the tertiary structure still remains homologous to saposin and other members of the SAPLIP family.

== Structure ==
Suggested relationship between saposin and swaposin. They could have evolved from a similar gene. Both consist of four alpha helices with the order of helices being permuted relative to each other.

Among plants, APs between different species are generally homologous exhibiting high sequence identity whilst maintaining a similar tertiary structure to pepsin. As such, plant APs preserve the zymogenic form of the mature AP common to other aspartic proteases in which the zymogen is kept inactive until removal of the prosegment from the active cleft.

=== Processing ===
The zymogenic form of plant APs contain the primary sequence of the PSI, although not all plant APs contain a PSI region. The PSI itself is composed of approximately 100 residues and is found in the C-terminal primary structure of zymogenic plant APs, forming an independent domain from the characteristic bilobal tertiary structure of aspartic proteases. In the case of Procardosin A, the zymogenic form of Cardosin A (the major AP found in cardoon), the PSI is first removed before activation of the mature enzyme occurs in which the prosegment is cleaved during proteolytic processing.

=== Tertiary structure ===
The crystal structure of prophytepsin (from barley) was the first known structure to elucidate the molecular topology of any PSI. The crystal structure of prophytepsin derived PSI revealed that the overall length and position of the helices found in PSI is conserved with those of NK-lysin, another member of the SAPLIP group. Moreover, sequence alignment between NK-lysin and PSI reveals that the relative positions of the disulfide bridges are also conserved, a common trait among SAPLIPS.

Several crystal structures exist, containing the coordinates of the zymogenic parent AP and the SAPLIP domain of the PSI, for cardoon and barley. In these crystal structures, the PSI domain takes on a “closed” tertiary structure similar to that of NK-lysin and saposin. The X-ray crystallographic structure of potato PSI, recombinantly expressed separately from its parent AP, revealed a tertiary structure similar to the open structure of saposin C and forms a homodimer at pH 7.4.

The first helix on the N-terminal end of the open structure of potato PSI also shows similarity in its tertiary structure to the hemagglutinin fusion peptide, exhibiting a similar boomerang motif. As well, this helix shares the overall helix-kink-helix shape with hemagglutinin induced by the presence of a tryptophan; this revelation is important as it suggests a reason for the N-terminal side helix interaction with phospholipid bilayers. That is, it is implied that this helix-kink-helix motif is critical for the fusogenic and membrane interactions of this helix.

== Function ==
The underlying function of proteins belonging to the SAPLIP group is to interact with membrane bilayers, either by perturbation (without permeabilization), permeabilization of the membrane or binding to the membrane. Notable members of the SAPLIP family include granulysin (antimicrobial), pulmonary surfactant-associated protein B (pulmonary surfactant regulation) and the saposins (sphingolipid degradation) of which SAPLIPs are named after.

Specific to the PSI, it has been shown that PSI is involved in mediating interactions of the PSI, both alone and in combination with the PSI’s parent enzyme, with phospholipid membranes at acidic pH (~pH 4.5). Specifically, the PSI is involved in vacuolar targeting and membrane perturbation; this enables both the storage and movement of the AP into protein storage compartments within vacuoles contained in both leaves and roots of barley and cardoon. This is similar to the function of the SapB domain in human AOAH.

Like other members of the SAPLIP family, the PSI confers antimicrobial activity. Potato PSI overexpressed separately in A. thalina increases resistance to the pathogen Botrytis cinerea, both by its own antifungal activity and by its ability to induce plant defenses. Potato PSI also has selective cytotoxic activity against pathogens and cancer cells (but not human T cells, RBC, or plant cells). It retains its antimicrobial activity when attached back into the parent AP.

Atomic force microscopy experimentation on potato PSI expressed separately from its parent AP has revealed that anionic phospholipid membranes are rearranged by PSI in a similar fashion to that observed with saposin C. As well, PSI from potato has also been shown to exhibit Michaelis-Menten-like kinetics, elucidated from large unilamellar vesicle (LUV) disruption assays in a dose-dependent manner, a feature unique among SAPLIPs. The Michaelis-Menten-like kinetics coupled with the PSIs independent function from its parent AP has thus led to the revelation that the PSI is the first known example of an “enzyme within an enzyme”.

== See also ==
- Prosaposin
- Fusion protein
