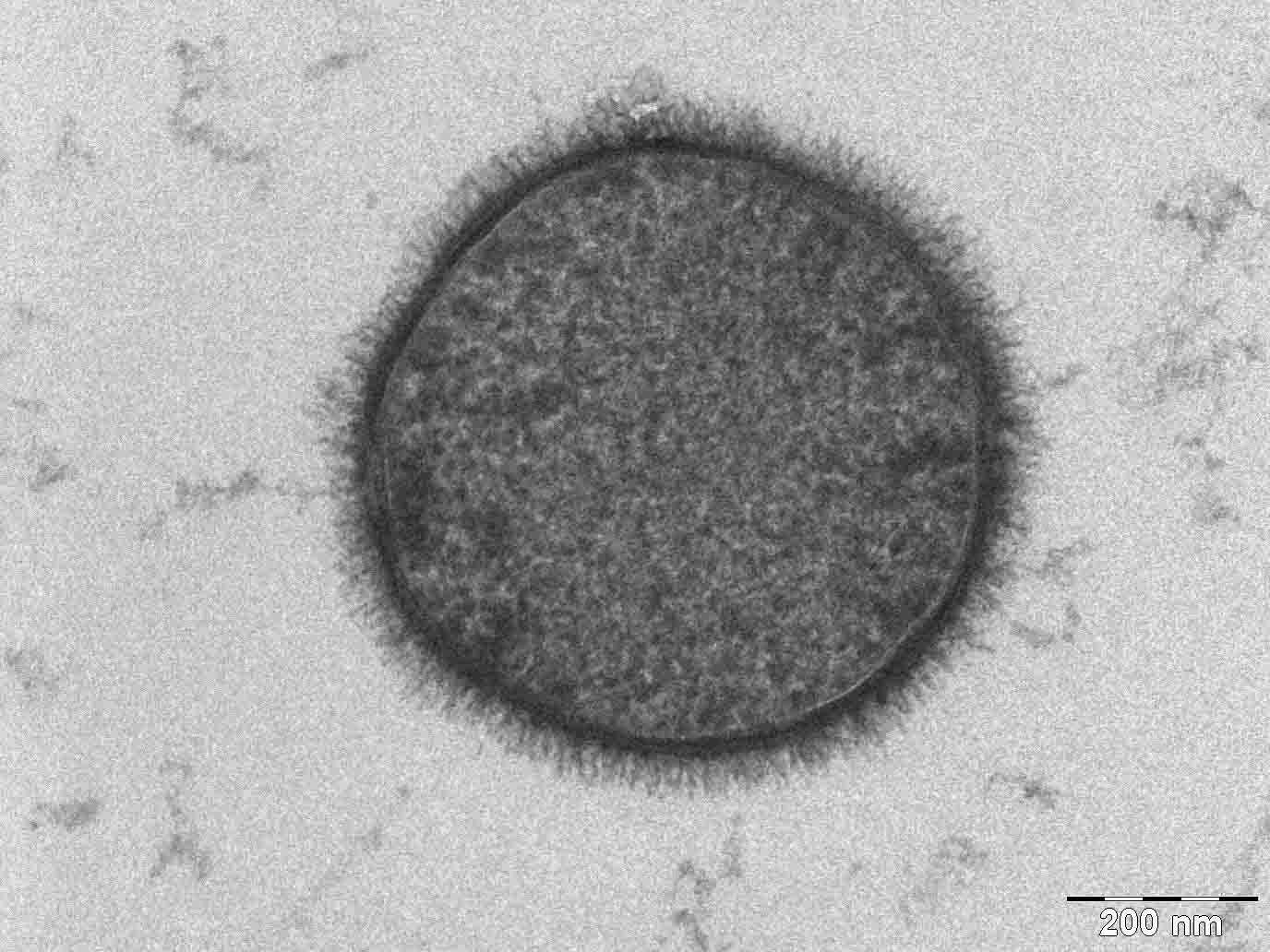
- TEM micrograph of a B. subtilis cell in cross-section (scale bar = 200 nm)

Scientific classification
- Domain: Bacteria
- Kingdom: Bacillati
- Phylum: Bacillota
- Class: Bacilli
- Order: Caryophanales
- Family: Bacillaceae
- Genus: Bacillus
- Species: B. subtilis

Binomial name
- Bacillus subtilis (Ehrenberg 1835); Cohn 1872

Synonyms
- Vibrio subtilis Ehrenberg 1835; Until 2008, Bacillus globigii was thought to be B. subtilis but is since formally recognized as Bacillus atrophaeus.

= Bacillus subtilis =

Catalase-positive bacterium

Bacillus subtilis, known also as the hay bacillus or grass bacillus, is a Gram-positive, catalase-positive bacterium, found in soil and the gastrointestinal tract of ruminants, humans, and marine sponges.

Bacillus subtilis is motile and amylase-positive. It forms biofilms through the formation of extracellular polymeric matrix containing sugars and proteins.

As a member of the genus Bacillus, B. subtilis is rod-shaped and can form a tough, protective endospore, allowing it to tolerate extreme environmental conditions. It historically has been classified as an obligate aerobe, though evidence exists that it is a facultative anaerobe. B. subtilis is considered the best-studied Gram-positive bacterium and a model organism to study bacterial chromosome replication and cell differentiation. It is one of the bacterial champions in secreted enzyme production and used on an industrial scale by biotechnology companies.

== Description ==
Bacillus subtilis is a Gram-positive bacterium, rod-shaped and catalase-positive. It was originally named Vibrio subtilis by Christian Gottfried Ehrenberg, and renamed Bacillus subtilis by Ferdinand Cohn in 1872 (subtilis being the Latin for "fine, thin, slender"). B. subtilis cells are typically rod-shaped, and are about 4–10 micrometers (μm) long and 0.25–1.0 μm in diameter, with a cell volume of about 4.6 fL at stationary phase.

As with other members of the genus Bacillus, it can form an endospore to survive extreme environmental conditions of temperature and desiccation. B. subtilis is a facultative anaerobe and had been considered as an obligate aerobe until 1998. B. subtilis is heavily flagellated, which gives it the ability to move quickly in liquids.

B. subtilis has proven highly amenable to genetic manipulation and has become widely adopted as a model organism for laboratory studies, especially of sporulation, which is a simplified example of cellular differentiation. In terms of popularity as a laboratory model organism, it is often considered as the Gram-positive equivalent of Escherichia coli, an extensively studied Gram-negative bacterium. The Indian State of Kerala declared the microbe as its own State microbe.

== Characteristics ==
Colony, morphological, physiological, and biochemical characteristics of B. subtilis are shown in the table below.

Light micrograph of Bacillus subtilis, showing its characteristic rod-shaped bacterial cells.

Test type	Test	Characteristics
Colony characters	Size	Medium
Colony characters	Type	Round
Colony characters	Color	Whitish
Colony characters	Shape	Convex
Morphological characters	Shape	Round
Physiological characters	Motility	+
Physiological characters	Growth at 6.5% NaCl	+
Biochemical characters	Gram staining	+
Biochemical characters	Oxidase	-
Biochemical characters	Catalase	+
Biochemical characters	Oxidative-Fermentative	Fermentative
Biochemical characters	Motility	-
Biochemical characters	Methyl Red	-
Biochemical characters	Voges-Proskauer	+
Biochemical characters	Indole	-
Biochemical characters	H_{2}S Production	+
Biochemical characters	Urease	-
Biochemical characters	Nitrate reductase	+
Biochemical characters	β-Galactosidase	+
Hydrolysis of	Gelatin	+
Hydrolysis of	Aesculin	+
Hydrolysis of	Casein	+
Hydrolysis of	Tween 40	+
Hydrolysis of	Tween 60	+
Hydrolysis of	Tween 80	+
Acid production from	Glycerol	+
Acid production from	Galactose	+
Acid production from	D-Glucose	+
Acid production from	D-Fructose	+
Acid production from	D-Mannose	+
Acid production from	Mannitol	+
Acid production from	N-Acetylglucosamine	+
Acid production from	Amygdalin	+
Acid production from	Maltose	+
Acid production from	D-Melibiose	+
Acid production from	D-Trehalose	+
Acid production from	Glycogen	+
Acid production from	D-Turanose	+

Note: + = Positive, – = Negative

== Habitat ==
This species is commonly found in the upper layers of the soil and is thought to be a normal gut commensal in humans. A 2009 study compared the density of spores found in soil (about 10^{6} spores per gram) to that found in human feces (about 10^{4} spores per gram). The number of spores found in the human gut was too high to be attributed solely to consumption through food contamination. In some bee habitats, B. subtilis appears in the gut flora of honey bees. B. subtilis can also be found in marine environments.

Some evidence indicates that B. subtilis is saprophytic in nature. The bacterium exhibits vegetative growth in soil rich in organic matter, and that spores were formed when nutrients were depleted. Additionally, B. subtilis has been shown to form biofilms on plant roots, which might explain why it is commonly found in gut microbiomes. Perhaps animals eating plants with B. subtilis biofilms can foster growth of the bacterium in their gastrointestinal tracts. The entire lifecycle of B. subtilis can be completed in the gastrointestinal tract, which lends credence to the idea that the bacterium enters the gut via plant consumption and stays present as a result of its ability to grow in the gut.

== Reproduction ==
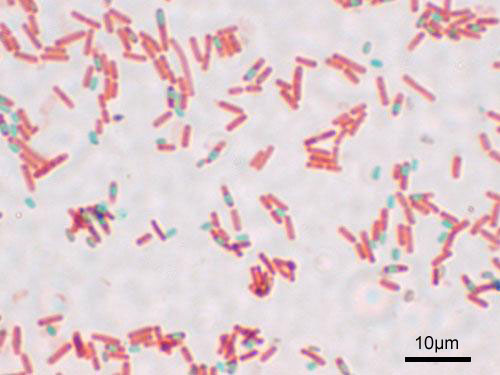
Sporulating B. subtilis

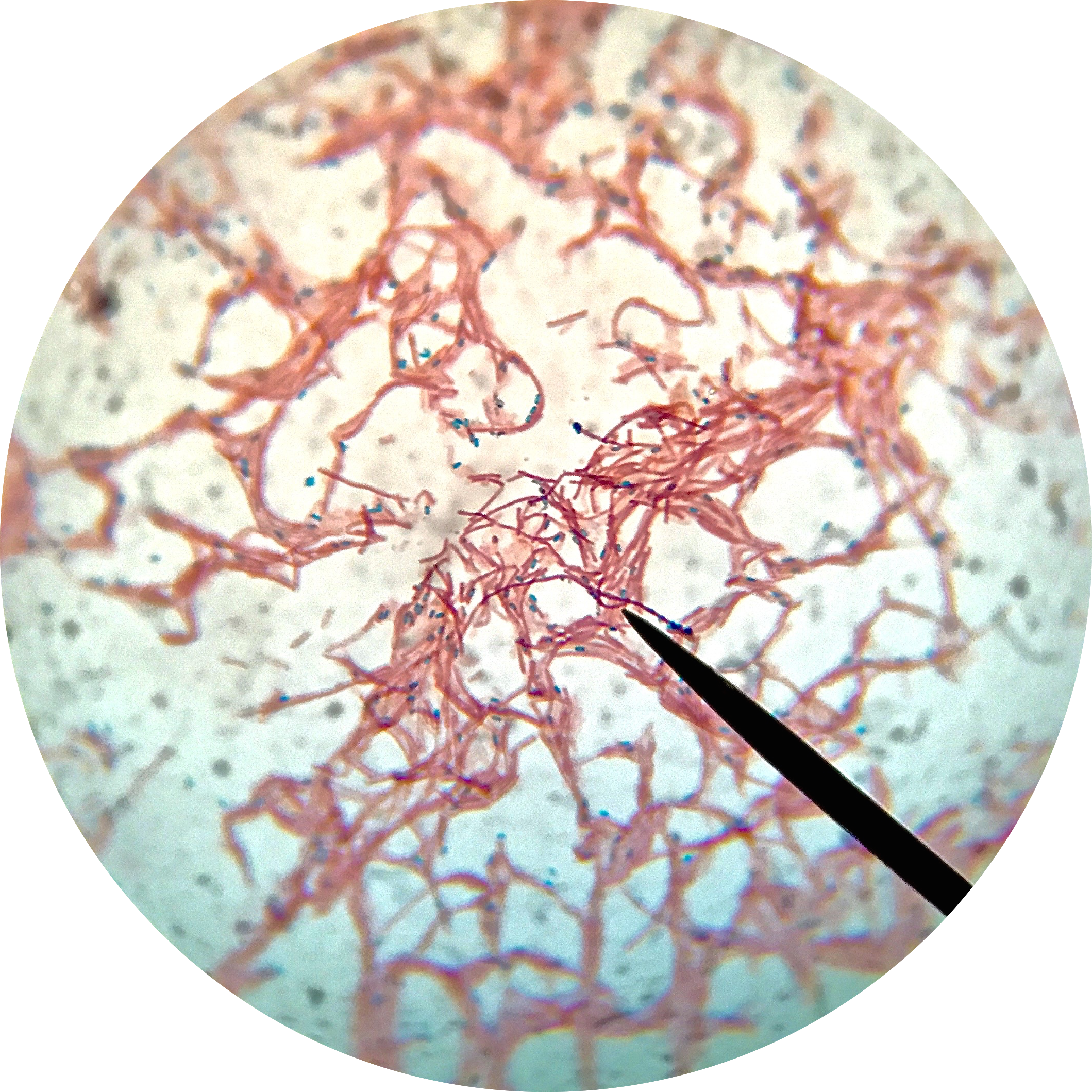
Another endospore stain of B. subtilis

Bacillus subtilis can divide symmetrically to make two daughter cells (binary fission), or asymmetrically, producing a single endospore that can remain viable for decades and is resistant to unfavourable environmental conditions such as drought, salinity, extreme pH, radiation, and solvents. The endospore is formed at times of nutritional stress and through the use of hydrolysis, allowing the organism to persist in the environment until conditions become favourable. This process has been very well studied and B. subtilis has served as a model organism for studying sporulation. Prior to the process of sporulation the cells might become motile by producing flagella, take up DNA from the environment, or produce antibiotics. These responses are viewed as attempts to seek out nutrients by seeking a more favourable environment, enabling the cell to make use of new beneficial genetic material or simply by killing off competition.

=== Sporulation ===
Although sporulation in B. subtilis is induced by starvation, the sporulation developmental program is not initiated immediately when growth slows due to nutrient limitation. A variety of alternative responses can occur, including the activation of flagellar motility to seek new food sources by chemotaxis, the production of antibiotics to destroy competing soil microbes, the secretion of hydrolytic enzymes to scavenge extracellular proteins and polysaccharides, or the induction of 'competence' for uptake of exogenous DNA for consumption, with the occasional side-effect that new genetic information is stably integrated. Sporulation is the last-ditch response to starvation and is suppressed until alternative responses prove inadequate. Even then, certain conditions must be met such as chromosome integrity, the state of chromosomal replication, and the functioning of the Krebs cycle.

Once B. subtilis commits to sporulation, the sigma factor sigma F is secreted. This factor promotes sporulation. A sporulation septum is formed and a chromosome is slowly moved into the forespore. When a third of one chromosome copy is in the forespore and the remaining two thirds is in the mother cell, the chromosome fragment in the forespore contains the locus for sigma F, which begins to be expressed in the forespore. In order to prevent sigma F expression in the mother cell, an anti-sigma factor, which is encoded by spoIIAB, is expressed. Any residual anti-sigma factor in the forespore (which would otherwise interfere with sporulation) is inhibited by an anti-anti-sigma factor, which is encoded by spoIIAA. SpoIIAA is located near the locus for the sigma factor, so it is consistently expressed in the forespore. Since the spoIIAB locus is not located near the sigma F and spoIIAA loci, it is expressed only in the mother cell and therefore repress sporulation in that cell, allowing sporulation to continue in the forespore. Residual spoIIAA in the mother cell represses spoIIAB, but spoIIAB is constantly replaced so it continues to inhibit sporulation. When the full chromosome localizes to the forespore, spoIIAB can repress sigma F. Therefore, the genetic asymmetry of the B. subtilis chromosome and expression of sigma F, spoIIAB and spoIIAA dictate spore formation in B. subtilis.

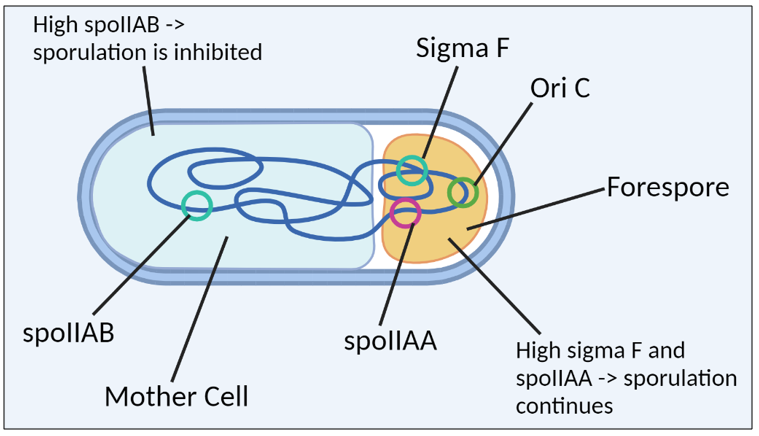
Regulation of sporulation in B. subtilis

Sporulation requires a great deal of time and also a lot of energy, making it crucial for a cell to monitor its surroundings efficiently and ensure that sporulation is embarked upon at only the most appropriate times. The wrong decision can be catastrophic: a vegetative cell will die if the conditions are too harsh, while bacteria forming spores in an environment which is conducive to vegetative growth will be out competed. In short, initiation of sporulation is a very tightly regulated network with numerous checkpoints for efficient control.

== Chromosomal replication ==
Bacillus subtilis is a model organism used to study bacterial chromosome replication. Replication of the single circular chromosome initiates at a single locus, the origin (oriC). Replication proceeds bidirectionally and two replication forks progress in clockwise and counterclockwise directions along the chromosome. Chromosome replication is completed when the forks reach the terminus region, which is positioned opposite to the origin on the chromosome map. The terminus region contains several short DNA sequences (Ter sites) that promote replication arrest. Specific proteins mediate all the steps in DNA replication. Comparison between the proteins involved in chromosomal DNA replication in B. subtilis and in Escherichia coli reveals similarities and differences. Although the basic components promoting initiation, elongation, and termination of replication are well-conserved, some important differences can be found (such as one bacterium missing proteins essential in the other). These differences underline the diversity in the mechanisms and strategies that various bacterial species have adopted to carry out the duplication of their genomes.

== Genome ==
Bacillus subtilis has about 4,100 genes. Of these, only 192 were shown to be indispensable; another 79 were predicted to be essential, as well. A vast majority of essential genes were categorized in relatively few domains of cell metabolism, with about half involved in information processing, one-fifth involved in the synthesis of cell envelope and the determination of cell shape and division, and one-tenth related to cell energetics.

The complete genome sequence of B. subtilis sub-strain QB928 has 4,146,839 DNA base pairs and 4,292 genes. The QB928 strain is widely used in genetic studies due to the presence of various markers [aroI(aroK)906 purE1 dal(alrA)1 trpC2].

Several noncoding RNAs have been characterized in the B. subtilis genome in 2009, including Bsr RNAs. Microarray-based comparative genomic analyses have revealed that B. subtilis members show considerable genomic diversity.

FsrA, a small RNA found in B. subtilis, is an effector of the iron-sparing response and acts to down-regulate iron-containing proteins in times of poor iron bioavailability.

A promising fish probiotic, B. subtilis strain WS1A, possesses antimicrobial activity against Aeromonas veronii and suppressed motile Aeromonas septicemia in Labeo rohita. The de novo assembly resulted in an estimated chromosome size of 4,148,460 bp, with 4,288 open reading frames. B. subtilis strain WS1A genome contains many potential genes, such as those encoding proteins involved in the biosynthesis of riboflavin, vitamin B_{6}, and amino acids (ilvD) and in carbon utilization (pta).

== Conditional gene essentiality ==
Studies using computational metabolic modeling have shown that gene essentiality in B. subtilis can vary depending on environmental conditions. Flux balance analysis simulations indicate that while some genes remain consistently essential for growth, others exhibit condition-dependent essentiality under nutrient or oxygen limitation.

Under nutrient-limited conditions, such as glucose or nitrogen restriction, metabolic activity shifts between biomass production and maintenance processes, altering growth outcomes. These findings suggest that metabolic robustness in B. subtilis involves tradeoffs between rapid growth and long-term survival under environmental stresses.

In response to nutrient limitation, B. subtilis can also initiate adaptive physiological responses, including metabolic diversification and endospore formation under prolonged stress.

== Transformation ==
Natural bacterial transformation involves the transfer of DNA from one bacterium to another through the surrounding medium. In B. subtilis, the length of transferred DNA is greater than 1,271 kb (more than 1 million bases). The transferred DNA is likely double-stranded DNA and is often more than a third of the total chromosome length of 4,215 kb. It appears that about 7–9% of the recipient cells take up an entire chromosome.

For a recipient bacterium to bind, take up exogenous DNA from another bacterium of the same species, and recombine it into its chromosome, it must enter a special physiological state called competence. Competence in B. subtilis is induced toward the end of logarithmic growth, especially under conditions of amino-acid limitation. Under these stressful conditions of semistarvation, cells typically have just one copy of their chromosome and likely have increased DNA damage. To test whether transformation is an adaptive function for B. subtilis to repair its DNA damage, experiments were conducted using UV light as the damaging agent. These experiments led to the conclusion that competence, with uptake of DNA, is specifically induced by DNA-damaging conditions, and that transformation functions as a process for recombinational repair of DNA damage.

While the natural competent state is common within laboratory B. subtilis samples and field isolates, some industrially relevant strains, e.g. B. subtilis (natto), are reluctant to take up DNA due to the presence of restriction modification systems that degrade exogenous DNA. B. subtilis (natto) mutants, which are defective in a type I restriction modification system endonuclease, are able to act as recipients of conjugative plasmids in mating experiments, paving the way for further genetic engineering of this particular strain.

By adopting Green Chemistry in the use of less hazardous materials, while saving cost, researchers have been mimicking nature's methods of synthesizing chemicals that can be useful for the food and drug industry, by "piggybacking molecules on shorts strands of DNA" before they are zipped together during their complementary base pairing between the two strands. Each strand can carry a particular molecule of interest that undergoes a specific chemical reaction simultaneously when the two corresponding strands of DNA pairs hold together like a zipper, allowing another molecule of interest, to react with one another in controlled and isolated reaction between those molecules being carried into these DNA complementary attachments. By using this method with certain bacteria that naturally follow a process replication in a multistep fashion, the researchers can simultaneously carry on the interactions of these added molecules to interact with enzymes and other molecules used for a secondary reaction by treating it like a capsule, which is similar to how the bacteria performs its own DNA replication processes.

== Uses ==
=== 20th century ===
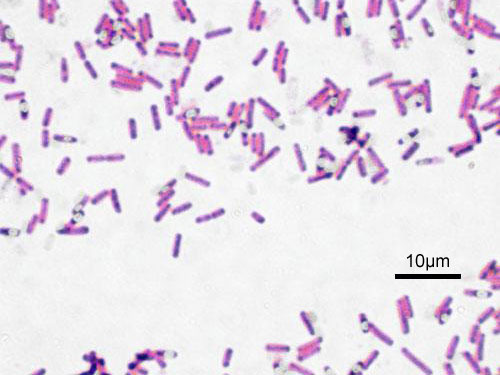
Gram-stained B. subtilis

Cultures of B. subtilis were popular worldwide, before the introduction of antibiotics, as an immunostimulatory agent to aid treatment of gastrointestinal and urinary tract diseases. It was used throughout the 1950s as an alternative medicine, which upon digestion has been found to significantly stimulate broad-spectrum immune activity, including activation of secretion of specific antibodies IgM, IgG and IgA and release of CpG dinucleotides inducing interferon IFN-α/IFNγ producing activity of leukocytes and cytokines important in the development of cytotoxicity towards tumor cells. It was marketed throughout America and Europe from 1946 as an immunostimulatory aid in the treatment of gut and urinary tract diseases such as rotavirus and shigellosis. In 1966, the U.S. Army dumped B. subtilis onto the grates of New York City subway stations for five days to observe how a biological agent dispensed around the subway trains would disperse and potentially affect unsuspecting passengers. Due to its ability to survive, it is thought to still be present there.

The antibiotic bacitracin was first isolated from a variety of Bacillus licheniformis named "Tracy I" in 1945, then considered part of the B. subtilis species. It is still commercially manufactured by growing the variety in a container of liquid growth medium. Over time, the bacteria synthesize bacitracin and secrete the antibiotic into the medium. The bacitracin is then extracted from the medium using chemical processes.

Since the 1960s, B. subtilis has had a history as a test species in spaceflight experimentation. Its endospores can survive up to 6 years in space if coated by dust particles protecting it from solar UV rays. It has been used as an extremophile survival indicator in outer space such as Exobiology Radiation Assembly, EXOSTACK, and EXPOSE orbital missions.

Wild-type natural isolates of B. subtilis are difficult to work with compared with laboratory strains that have undergone domestication processes of mutagenesis and selection. These strains often have improved capabilities of transformation (uptake and integration of environmental DNA), growth, and loss of abilities needed "in the wild". While dozens of different strains fitting this description exist, the strain designated '168' is the most widely used. Strain 168, a tryptophan auxotroph isolated after X-ray mutagenesis of B. subtilis Marburg strain, is widely used in research due to its high transformation efficiency.

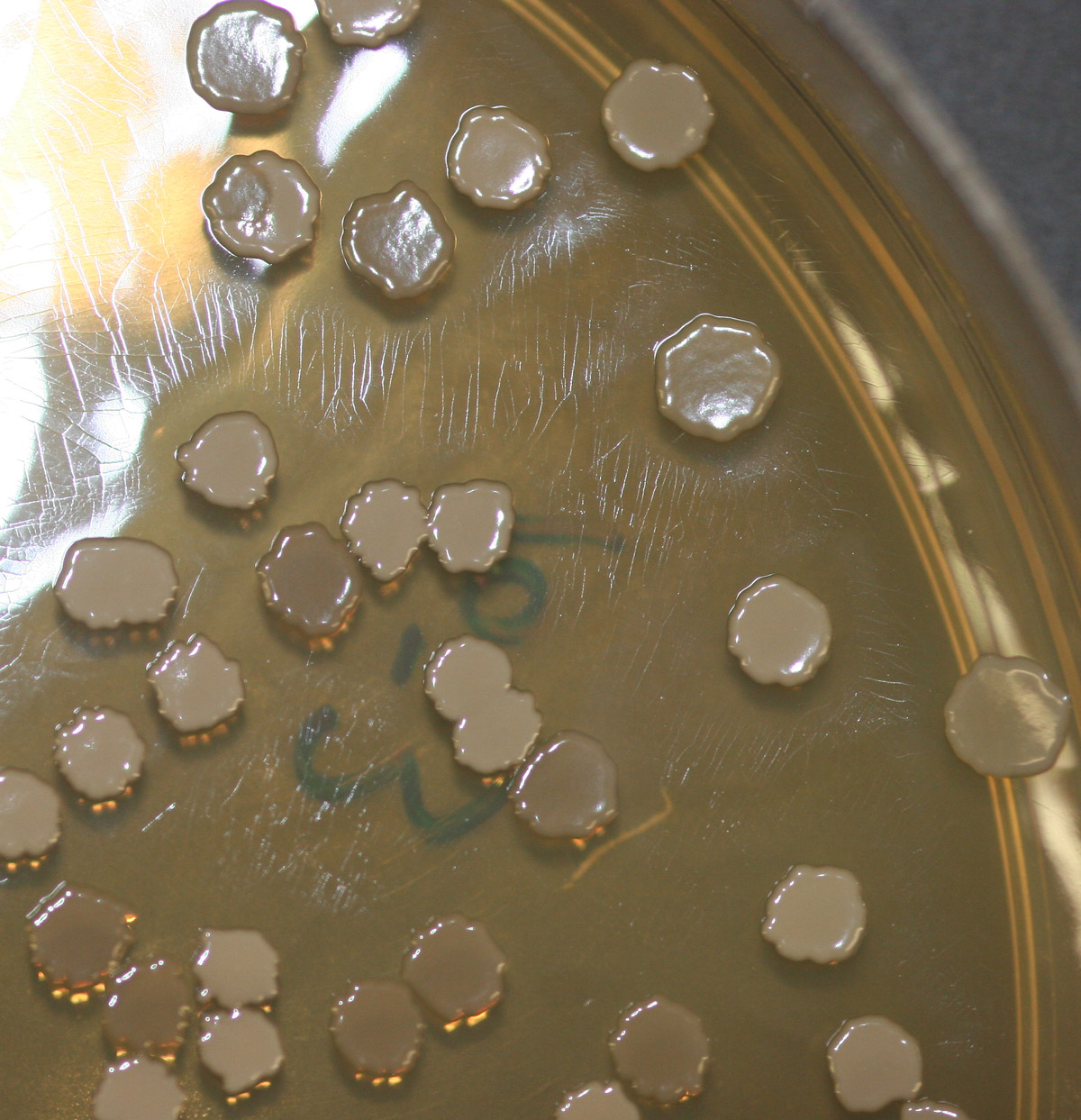
Colonies of B. subtilis grown on a culture dish in a molecular biology laboratory

Bacillus globigii, a closely related but phylogenetically distinct species now known as Bacillus atrophaeus was used as a biowarfare simulant during Project SHAD (a.k.a. Project 112). Subsequent genomic analysis showed that the strains used in those studies were products of deliberate enrichment for strains that exhibited abnormally high rates of sporulation.

A strain of B. subtilis formerly known as Bacillus natto is used in the commercial production of the Japanese food nattō, as well as the similar Korean food cheonggukjang.

=== 21st century ===
- As a model organism, B. subtilis is commonly used in laboratory studies directed at discovering the fundamental properties and characteristics of Gram-positive, spore-forming bacteria. In particular, the basic principles and mechanisms underlying formation of the durable endospore have been deduced from studies of spore formation in B. subtilis.
- Its surface-binding properties play a role in safe radionuclide waste [e.g. thorium (IV) and plutonium (IV)] disposal.
- Due to its excellent fermentation properties, with high product yields (20 to 25 g/l), it is used to produce various enzymes, such as amylase and proteases.
- B. subtilis is used as a soil inoculant in horticulture and agriculture.
- It may provide some benefit to saffron growers by speeding corn growth and increasing stigma biomass yield.
- It is used as an "indicator organism" during gas sterilization procedures, to ensure a sterilization cycle has completed successfully. Specifically B. subtilis endospores are used to verify that a cycle has reached spore-destroying conditions.
- B. subtilis has been found to act as a useful bioproduct fungicide that prevents the growth of Monilinia vaccinii-corymbosi, a.k.a. the mummy berry fungus, without interfering with pollination or fruit qualities.
- Both metabolically active and metabolically inactive B. subtilis cells have been shown to reduce gold (III) to gold (I) and gold (0) when oxygen is present. This biotic reduction plays a role in gold cycling in geological systems and could potentially be used to recover solid gold from said systems.
- Pairing B. subtilis with chitosan has been shown to reduce green mold decay in citrus fruits.

=== Novel and artificial substrains ===
- Novel strains of B. subtilis that could use 4-fluorotryptophan (4FTrp) but not canonical tryptophan (Trp) for propagation were isolated. As Trp is only coded by a single codon, some evidence shows that Trp can be displaced by 4FTrp in the genetic code. The experiments showed that the canonical genetic code can be mutable.
- Recombinant strains pBE2C1 and pBE2C1AB were used in production of polyhydroxyalkanoates (PHA), and malt waste can be used as their carbon source for lower-cost PHA production.
- It is used to produce hyaluronic acid, which is used in the joint-care sector in healthcare and cosmetics.
- Monsanto has isolated a gene from B. subtilis that expresses cold shock protein B and spliced it into its drought-tolerant corn hybrid MON 87460, which was approved for sale in the US in November 2011.
- A new strain has been modified to convert nectar into honey by secreting enzymes.

== Safety ==
=== In other animals ===
Bacillus subtilis was reviewed by the US FDA Center for Veterinary Medicine and found to present no safety concerns when used in direct-fed microbial products, so the Association of American Feed Control Officials has listed it approved for use as an animal feed ingredient under Section 36.14, Direct-fed Microorganisms. The Canadian Food Inspection Agency Animal Health and Production Feed Section has classified Bacillus culture dehydrated approved feed ingredients as a silage additive under Schedule IV-Part 2-Class 8.6 and assigned the International Feed Ingredient number IFN 8-19-119. Several feed additives containing viable spores of B. subtilis, though, have been evaluated positively by the European Food Safety Authority, regarding their safe use for increasing weight gain in animal production.

=== In humans ===
B. subtilis spores can survive the extreme heat generated during cooking. Some B. subtilis strains are responsible for causing ropiness or rope spoilage – a sticky, stringy consistency caused by bacterial production of long-chain polysaccharides – in spoiled bread dough and baked goods. For a long time, bread ropiness was associated uniquely with B. subtilis species by biochemical tests. Molecular assays (randomly amplified polymorphic DNA PCR assay, denaturing gradient gel electrophoresis analysis, and sequencing of the V3 region of 16S ribosomal DNA) revealed greater Bacillus species variety in ropy breads, which all seems to have a positive amylase activity and high heat resistance.

B. subtilis CU1 (2 billion spores per day) was evaluated in a 16-week study (10 days administration of probiotic, followed by an 18-day wash-out period per each month; repeated same procedure for 4 months) to healthy subjects. B. subtilis CU1 was found to be safe and well tolerated in the subjects without any side effects.

B. subtilis and substances derived from it have been evaluated by different authoritative bodies for their safe and beneficial use in food. In the United States, an opinion letter issued in the early 1960s by the Food and Drug Administration (FDA) designated some substances derived from microorganisms as generally recognized as safe, including carbohydrase and protease enzymes from B. subtilis. The opinions were predicated on the use of nonpathogenic and nontoxicogenic strains of the respective organisms and on the use of current good manufacturing practices. The FDA stated that the enzymes derived from the B. subtilis strain were in common use in food prior to January 1, 1958, and that nontoxigenic and nonpathogenic strains of B. subtilis are widely available and have been safely used in a variety of food applications. This includes consumption of Japanese fermented soybean, in the form of natto, which is commonly consumed in Japan, and contains as many as 10^{8} viable cells per gram.

The fermented beans are recognized for their contribution to a healthy gut flora and vitamin K_{2} intake; during this long history of widespread use, natto has not been implicated in adverse events potentially attributable to the presence of B. subtilis. The natto product and the B. subtilis natto as its principal component are Foods for Specified Health Use approved by the Japanese Ministry of Health, Labour, and Welfare as effective for preservation of health.

B. subtilis has been granted "Qualified Presumption of Safety" status by the European Food Safety Authority.

== See also ==
- Adenylosuccinate lyase deficiency
- Guthrie test
- YlbH leader
