= YlbH leader =

ylbH leader
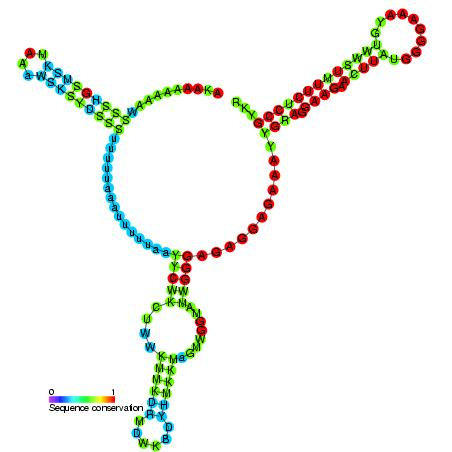
- Predicted secondary structure and sequence conservation of ylbH

Identifiers
- Symbol: ylbH
- Rfam: RF00516

Other data
- RNA type: Cis-reg; leader
- Domain(s): Bacteria
- SO: SO:0005836
- PDB structures: PDBe

This family is a putative regulatory RNA structure that is found upstream of the ylbH gene in B. subtilis and related low GC Gram-positive bacteria.

== See also ==
- Leader sequence
- Riboswitch
