= Structural alignment software =

This list of structural comparison and alignment software is a compilation of software tools and web portals used in pairwise or multiple structural comparison and structural alignment.

== Structural comparison and alignment ==
NAME	Description	Class	Type	Flexible	Link	Author	Year
Reseek	Fast and accurate protein structure alignment, search and visualization	Cα	Pair	Yes	download server	Edgar R.C.	2024
MUSCLE-3D	Fast and accurate multiple protein structure alignment and visualization	Cα	Multi	Yes	download	Edgar R.C. & Tolstoy I	2024
ARTEMIS	Topology-independent superposition of RNA/DNA 3D structures and structure-based sequence alignment	AllA	Pair	No	server download	Bohdan D.R.; Bujnicki J.M.; Baulin E.F.	2024
ARTEM	Superposition of two arbitrary RNA/DNA 3D structure fragments & 3D motif identification	AllA	Pair	No	server download	Bohdan D.R.; Voronina V.V.; Bujnicki J.M.; Baulin E.F.	2023
foldseek	Fast and accurate protein structure alignment and visualisation	Seq	Pair	Yes	server download	M. van Kempen & S. Kim & C. Tumescheit & M. Mirdita & J. Lee & C. Gilchrist & J. Söding & M. Steinegger	2023
3decision	Protein structure repository with visualisation and structural analytics tools	Seq	Multi	Yes	site	P. Schmidtke	2015
MAMMOTH	MAtching Molecular Models Obtained from Theory	Cα	Pair	No	server download	CEM Strauss & AR Ortiz	2002
CE	Combinatorial Extension	Cα	Pair	No	server	I. Shindyalov	2000
CE-MC	Combinatorial Extension-Monte Carlo	Cα	Multi	No	server	C. Guda	2004
DaliLite	Distance Matrix Alignment	C-Map	Pair	No	server and download	L. Holm	1993
TM-align	TM-score based protein structure alignment	Cα	Pair	nil	server and download	Y. Zhang & J. Skolnick	2005
mTM-align	Multiple protein structure alignment based on TM-align	Cα	Multi	No	server and download	R. Dong, Z. Peng, Y. Zhang & J. Yang	2018
VAST	Vector Alignment Search Tool	SSE	Pair	nil	server	S. Bryant	1996
PrISM	Protein Informatics Systems for Modeling	SSE	Multi	nil	server	B. Honig	2000
MOE	Molecular Operating Environment. Extensive platform for protein and protein-ligand structure modelling.	Cα, AllA, Seq	Multi	No	site	Chemical Computing Group	2000
SSAP	Sequential Structure Alignment Program	SSE	Multi	No	server	C. Orengo & W. Taylor	1989
SARF2	Spatial ARrangements of Backbone Fragments	SSE	Pair	nil	server	N. Alexandrov	1996
KENOBI/K2	NA	SSE	Pair	nil	server	Z. Weng	2000
STAMP	STructural Alignment of Multiple Proteins	Cα	Multi	No	download server	R. Russell & G. Barton	1992
MASS	Multiple Alignment by Secondary Structure	SSE	Multi	No	server	O. Dror & H. Wolfson	2003
SCALI	Structural Core ALIgnment of proteins	Seq/C-Map	Pair	nil	server download	X. Yuan & C. Bystroff	2004
DEJAVU	NA	SSE	Pair	nil	server	GJ. Kleywegt	1997
SSM	Secondary Structure Matching	SSE	Multi	nil	server	E. Krissinel	2003
SHEBA	Structural Homology by Environment-Based Alignment	Seq	Pair	nil	server	J Jung & B Lee	2000
LGA	Local-Global Alignment, and Global Distance Test (GDT-TS) structure similarity measure	Cα, AllA, any atom	Pair	nil	server and download	A. Zemla	2003
POSA	Partial Order Structure Alignment	Cα	Multi	Yes	server	Y. Ye & A. Godzik	2005
PyMOL	"super" command does sequence-independent 3D alignment	Protein	Hybrid	No	site	W. L. DeLano	2007
FATCAT	Flexible Structure AlignmenT by Chaining Aligned Fragment Pairs Allowing Twists	Cα	Pair	Yes	server	Y. Ye & A. Godzik	2003
deconSTRUCT	Database search on substructural level and pairwise alignment.	SSE	Multi	No	server	ZH. Zhang et al.	2010
Matras	MArkovian TRAnsition of protein Structure	Cα & SSE	Pair	nil	server	K. Nishikawa	2000
MAMMOTH-mult	MAMMOTH-based multiple structure alignment	Cα	Multi	No	server	D. Lupyan	2005
Protein3Dfit	NA	C-Map	Pair	nil	server	D. Schomburg	1994
PRIDE	PRobability of IDEntity	Cα	Pair	nil	server	S. Pongor	2002
FAST	FAST Alignment and Search Tool	Cα	Pair	nil	server	J. Zhu	2004
C-BOP	Coordinate-Based Organization of Proteins	N/A	Multi	nil	server	E. Sandelin	2005
ProFit	Protein least-squares Fitting	Cα	Multi	nil	server	ACR. Martin	1996
TOPOFIT	Alignment as a superimposition of common volumes at a topomax point	Cα	Pair	nil	server	VA. Ilyin	2004
MUSTANG	MUltiple STructural AligNment AlGorithm	Cα & C-Map	Multi	nil	download	A.S. Konagurthu et al.	2006
URMS	Unit-vector RMSD	Cα	Pair	nil	server	K. Kedem	2003
LOCK	Hierarchical protein structure superposition	SSE	Pair	No	NA	AP. Singh	1997
LOCK 2	Improvements over LOCK	SSE	Pair	No	download	J. Shapiro	2003
CBA	Consistency Based Alignment	SSE	Multi	nil	download	J. Ebert	2006
TetraDA	Tetrahedral Decomposition Alignment	SSE	Multi	Yes	NA	J. Roach	2005
STRAP	STRucture based Alignment Program	Cα	Multi	nil	server	C. Gille	2006
LOVOALIGN	Low Order Value Optimization methods for Structural Alignment	Cα	Pair	nil	server	Andreani et al.	2006
GANGSTA	Genetic Algorithm for Non-sequential, Gapped protein STructure Alignment	SSE/C-Map	Pair	No	server	B. Kolbeck	2006
GANGSTA+	Combinatorial algorithm for nonsequential and gapped structural alignment	SSE/C-Map	Pair	No	server	A. Guerler & E.W. Knapp	2008
MatAlign	Protein Structure Comparison by Matrix Alignment	C-Map	Pair	nil	site	Z. Aung & K.L. Tan	2006
Vorolign	Fast structure alignment using Voronoi contacts	C-Map	Multi	Yes	server	F. Birzele et al.	2006
EXPRESSO	Fast Multiple Structural Alignment using T-Coffee and Sap	Cα	Multi	nil	site	C. Notredame et al.	2007
CAALIGN	Cα Align	Cα	Multi	nil	site	T.J. Oldfield	2007
YAKUSA	Internal Coordinates and BLAST type algorithm	Cα	Pair	nil	site	M. Carpentier et al.	2005
BLOMAPS	Conformation-based alphabet alignments	Cα	Multi	nil	server	W-M. Zheng & S. Wang	2008
CLEPAPS	Conformation-based alphabet alignments	Cα	Pair	nil	server	W-M. Zheng & S. Wang	2008
TALI F	Torsion Angle ALIgnment	Cα	Pair	No	NA	X. Mioa	2006
MolCom	NA	Geometry	Multi	nil	NA	S.D. O'Hearn	2003
MALECON	NA	Geometry	Multi	nil	NA	S. Wodak	2004
FlexProt	Flexible Alignment of Protein Structures	Cα	Pair	Yes	server	M. Shatsky & H. Wolfson	2002
MultiProt	Multiple Alignment of Protein Structures	Geometry	Multi	No	server	M. Shatsky & H. Wolfson	2004
CTSS	Protein Structure Alignment Using Local Geometrical Features	Geometry	Pair	nil	site	T. Can	2004
CURVE	NA	Geometry	Multi	No	site	D. Zhi	2006
Matt	Multiple Alignment with Translations and Twists	Cα	Multi	Yes	server download	M. Menke	2008
TopMatch	Protein structure alignment and visualization of structural similarities; alignment of multiprotein complexes	Cα	Pair	No	server download	M. Sippl & M. Wiederstein	2012
SSGS	Secondary Structure Guided Superimposition	Ca	Pair	No	site	G. Wainreb et al.	2006
Matchprot	Comparison of protein structures by growing neighborhood alignments	Cα	Pair	No	server	S. Bhattacharya et al.	2007
UCSF Chimera	see MatchMaker tool and "matchmaker" command	Seq & SSE	Multi	No	site	E. Meng et al.	2006
FLASH	Fast aLignment Algorithm for finding Structural Homology of proteins	SSE	Pair	No	NA	E.S.C. Shih & M-J Hwang	2003
RAPIDO	Rapid Alignment of Protein structures In the presence of Domain mOvements	Cα	Pair	Yes	server	R. Mosca & T.R. Schneider	2008
ComSubstruct	Structural Alignment based on Differential Geometrical Encoding	Geometry	Pair	Yes	site	N. Morikawa	2008
ProCKSI	Protein (Structure) Comparison, Knowledge, Similarity and Information	Other	Pair	No	site	D. Barthel et al.	2007
SARST	Structure similarity search Aided by Ramachandran Sequential Transformation	Cα	Pair	nil	site	W-C. Lo et al.	2007
Fr-TM-align	Fragment-TM-score based protein structure alignment	Cα	Pair	no	site	S.B. Pandit & J. Skolnick	2008
TOPS+ COMPARISON	Comparing topological models of protein structures enhanced with ligand information	Topology	Pair	Yes	server	M. Veeramalai & D. Gilbert	2008
TOPS++FATCAT	Flexible Structure AlignmenT by Chaining Aligned Fragment Pairs Allowing Twists derived from TOPS+ String Model	Cα	Pair	Yes	server	M. Veeramalai et al.	2008
MolLoc	Molecular Local Surface Alignment	Surf	Pair	No	server	M.E. Bock et al.	2007
FASE	Flexible Alignment of Secondary Structure Elements	SSE	Pair	Yes	NA	J. Vesterstrom & W. R. Taylor	2006
SABERTOOTH	Protein Structural Alignment based on a vectorial Structure Representation	Cα	Pair	Yes	server	F. Teichert et al.	2007
STON	NA	Cα	Pair	No	site	C. Eslahchi et al.	2009
SALIGN	Sequence-Structure Hybrid Method	Seq	Multi	No	site	M.S. Madhusudhan et al.	2007
MAX-PAIRS	NA	Cα	Pair	No	site	A. Poleksic	2009
THESEUS	Maximum likelihood superpositioning	Cα	Multi	No	site	D.L. Theobald & D.S. Wuttke	2006
TABLEAUSearch	Structural Search and Retrieval using a Tableau Representation of Protein Folding Patterns	SSE	Pair	No	server	A.S. Konagurthu et al.	2008
QP Tableau Search	Tableau-based protein substructure search using quadratic programming	SSE	Pair	No	download	A.Stivala et al.	2009
ProSMoS	Protein Structure Motif Search	SSE	Pair	No	server download	S. Shi et al.	2007
MISTRAL	Energy-based multiple structural alignment of proteins	Cα	Multi	No	server	C. Micheletti & H. Orland	2009
MSVNS for MaxCMO	A simple and fast heuristic for protein structure comparison	C-Map	Pair	No	site	D. Pelta et al.	2008
Structal	Least Squares Root Mean Square deviation minimization by dynamic programming	Cα	Pair	No	server download	Gerstein & Levitt	2005
ProBiS	Detection of Structurally Similar Protein Binding Sites by Local Structural Alignment	Surf	Pair	Yes	server download	J. Konc & D. Janezic	2010
ALADYN	Dynamics-based Alignment: superposing proteins by matching their collective movements	Cα	Pair	No	server	Potestio et al.	2010
SWAPSC	Sliding Window Analysis Procedure for detecting Selective Constraints for analysing genetic data structured for a family or phylogenetic tree using constraints in protein-coding sequence alignments.	Seq	Multi	yes	Server	Mario A. Fares	2004
SA Tableau Search	Fast and accurate protein substructure searching with simulated annealing and GPUs	SSE	Pair	No	download	A.Stivala et al.	2010
RCSB PDB Protein Comparison Tool	Provides CE, FATCAT, CE variation for Circular Permutations, Sequence Alignments	Cα	Pair	yes	server download	A. Prlic et al.	2010
CSR	Maximal common 3D motif; non-parametric; outputs pairwise correspondence; works also on small molecules	SSE or Cα	Pair	No	server download	M. Petitjean	1998
EpitopeMatch	discontinuous structure matching; induced fit consideration; flexible geometrical and physicochemical specificity definition; transplantation of similar spatial arrangements of amino acid residues	Cα-AllA	Multi	Yes	download	S. Jakuschev	2011
CLICK	Topology-independent 3D structure comparison	SSE & Cα & SASA	Pair	Yes	server	M. Nguyen	2011
Smolign	Spatial motifs based protein structural alignment	SSE & C-Map	Multi	Yes	download	H. Sun	2010
3D-Blast	Comparing three-dimensional shape-density	Density	Pair	No	server	L. Mavridis et al.	2011
DEDAL	DEscriptor Defined ALignment	SSE & Cα & C-Map	Pair	Yes	server	P. Daniluk & B. Lesyng	2011
msTALI	multiple sTructure ALIgnment	Cα & Dihed & SSE & Surf	Multi	Yes	server	P. Shealy & H. Valafar	2012
mulPBA	multiple PB sequence alignment	PB	Multi	Yes	NA	A.P. Joseph et al.	2012
SAS-Pro	Similtaneous Alignment and Superimposition of PROteins	???	Pair	Yes	server	Shah & Sahinidis	2012
MIRAGE-align	Match Index based structural alignment method	SSE & PPE	Pair	No	website	K. Hung et al.	2012
SPalign	Structure Pairwise alignment	Cα	Pair	No	server download	Y. Yang et al.	2012
Kpax	Fast Pairwise or Multiple Alignments using Gaussian Overlap	Other	Pair	Yes	website	D.W. Ritchie	2016
DeepAlign	Protein structure alignment beyond spatial proximity (evolutionary information and hydrogen-bonding are taken into consideration)	Cα + Seq	Pair	No	download server	S. Wang and J. Xu	2013
3DCOMB	extension of DeepAlign	Cα	Multi	No	download server	S. Wang and J. Xu	2012
TS-AMIR	A topology string alignment method for intensive rapid protein structure comparison	SSE & Cα	Pair	No	NA	J. Razmara et al.	2012
MICAN	MICAN can handle Multiple-chains, Inverse alignments, C α only models, Alternative alignments, and Non-sequential alignments	Cα	Pair	No	download	S.Minami et al.	2013
SPalignNS	Structure Pairwise alignment Non-Sequential	Cα	Pair	No	server download	P. Brown et al.	2015
Fit3D	highly accurate screening for small structural motifs featuring definition of position-specific exchanges, detection of intra- and inter-molecular occurrences, definition of arbitrary atoms used for motif alignment	AllA, Cα	Multi	No	server download	F. Kaiser et al.	2015
MMLigner	Bayesian statistical inference of alignments based on information theory and compression.	Cα	Pair	Yes	server download	J. Collier et al.	2017
RCSB PDB strucmotif-search	Small structural motifs search that takes seconds to run on 180k or more structures, with nucleic acid & bioassembly support	AllA	Multi	No	server/documentation download	S. Bittrich et al.	2020

Key map:

- Class:

- Cα -- Backbone Atom (Cα) Alignment;
- AllA -- All Atoms Alignment;
- SSE -- Secondary Structure Elements Alignment;
- Seq -- Sequence-based alignment
- Pair -- Pairwise Alignment (2 structures *only*);
- Multi -- Multiple Structure Alignment (MStA);
- C-Map -- Contact Map
- Surf -- Connolly Molecular Surface Alignment
- SASA -- Solvent Accessible Surface Area
- Dihed -- Dihedral Backbone Angles
- PB -- Protein Blocks

- Flexible:

- No -- Only rigid-body transformations are considered between the structures being compared.
- Yes -- The method allows for some flexibility within the structures being compared, such as movements around hinge regions.
