= Structural alignment =

Aligning molecular sequences using sequence and structural information

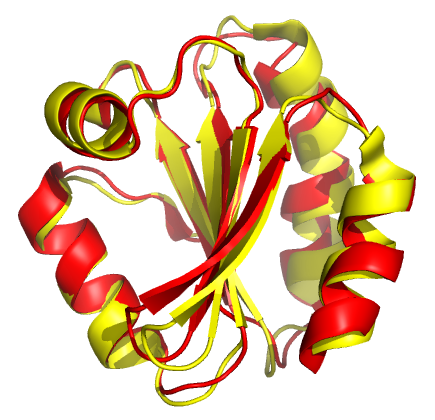
Structural alignment of thioredoxins from humans and the fly Drosophila melanogaster. The proteins are shown as ribbons, with the human protein in red, and the fly protein in yellow. Generated from PDB 3TRX and 1XWC.

Structural alignment attempts to establish homology between two or more polymer structures based on their shape and three-dimensional conformation. This process is usually applied to protein tertiary structures but can also be used for large RNA molecules. In contrast to simple structural superposition, where at least some equivalent residues of the two structures are known, structural alignment requires no a priori knowledge of equivalent positions. Structural alignment is a valuable tool for the comparison of proteins with low sequence similarity, where evolutionary relationships between proteins cannot be easily detected by standard sequence alignment techniques. Structural alignment can therefore be used to infer evolutionary relationships between proteins that share very little common sequence. Those relationships can then be characterized through structural phylogenetics. However, caution should be taken when interpreting any results as evidence for shared evolutionary ancestry due to the potential confounding effects of convergent evolution, by which unrelated or distantly-related amino acid sequences converge on a common tertiary structure.

Structural alignments can compare two sequences or multiple sequences. Because these alignments rely on information about all the query sequences' three-dimensional conformations, the method can only be used on sequences where these structures are known. These are usually found by X-ray crystallography or NMR spectroscopy. It is possible to perform a structural alignment on structures produced by structure prediction methods. Indeed, evaluating such predictions often requires a structural alignment between the model and the true known structure to assess the model's quality. Structural alignments are especially useful in analyzing data from structural genomics and proteomics efforts, and they can be used as comparison points to evaluate alignments produced by purely sequence-based bioinformatics methods.

The outputs of a structural alignment are a superposition of the atomic coordinate sets and a minimal root mean square deviation (RMSD) between the structures. The RMSD of two aligned structures indicates their divergence from one another. Structural alignment can be complicated by the existence of multiple protein domains within one or more of the input structures, because changes in relative orientation of the domains between two structures to be aligned can artificially inflate the RMSD.

== Data produced by structural alignment ==
The minimum information produced from a successful structural alignment is a set of residues that are considered equivalent between the structures. This set of equivalences is then typically used to superpose the three-dimensional coordinates for each input structure. (Note that one input element may be fixed as a reference and therefore its superposed coordinates do not change.) The fitted structures can be used to calculate mutual RMSD values, as well as other more sophisticated measures of structural similarity such as the global distance test (GDT, the metric used in CASP). The structural alignment also implies a corresponding one-dimensional sequence alignment from which a sequence identity, or the percentage of residues that are identical between the input structures, can be calculated as a measure of how closely the two sequences are related.

== Types of comparisons ==
Because protein structures are composed of amino acids whose side chains are linked by a common protein backbone, a number of different possible subsets of the atoms that make up a protein macromolecule can be used in producing a structural alignment and calculating the corresponding RMSD values. When aligning structures with very different sequences, the side chain atoms generally are not taken into account because their identities differ between many aligned residues. For this reason it is common for structural alignment methods to use by default only the backbone atoms included in the peptide bond. For simplicity and efficiency, often only the alpha carbon positions are considered, since the peptide bond has a minimally variant planar conformation. Only when the structures to be aligned are highly similar or even identical is it meaningful to align side-chain atom positions, in which case the RMSD reflects not only the conformation of the protein backbone but also the rotameric states of the side chains. Other comparison criteria that reduce noise and bolster positive matches include secondary structure assignment, native contact maps or residue interaction patterns, measures of side chain packing, and measures of hydrogen bond retention.

=== Structural superposition ===
The most basic possible comparison between protein structures makes no attempt to align the input structures and requires a precalculated alignment as input to determine which of the residues in the sequence are intended to be considered in the RMSD calculation. Structural superposition is commonly used to compare multiple conformations of the same protein (in which case no alignment is necessary, since the sequences are the same) and to evaluate the quality of alignments produced using only sequence information between two or more sequences whose structures are known. This method traditionally uses a simple least-squares fitting algorithm, in which the optimal rotations and translations are found by minimizing the sum of the squared distances among all structures in the superposition. More recently, maximum likelihood and Bayesian methods have greatly increased the accuracy of the estimated rotations, translations, and covariance matrices for the superposition.

Algorithms based on multidimensional rotations and modified quaternions have been developed to identify topological relationships between protein structures without the need for a predetermined alignment. Such algorithms have successfully identified canonical folds such as the four-helix bundle. The SuperPose method is sufficiently extensible to correct for relative domain rotations and other structural pitfalls.

=== Evaluating similarity ===
Often the purpose of seeking a structural superposition is not so much the superposition itself, but an evaluation of the similarity of two structures or a confidence in a remote alignment. A subtle but important distinction from maximal structural superposition is the conversion of an alignment to a meaningful similarity score. Most methods output some sort of "score" indicating the quality of the superposition. However, what one actually wants is not merely an estimated "Z-score" or an estimated E-value of seeing the observed superposition by chance but instead one desires that the estimated E-value is tightly correlated to the true E-value. Critically, even if a method's estimated E-value is precisely correct on average, if it lacks a low standard deviation on its estimated value generation process, then the rank ordering of the relative similarities of a query protein to a comparison set will rarely agree with the "true" ordering.

Different methods will superimpose different numbers of residues because they use different quality assurances and different definitions of "overlap"; some only include residues meeting multiple local and global superposition criteria and others are more greedy, flexible, and promiscuous. A greater number of atoms superposed can mean more similarity but it may not always produce the best E-value quantifying the unlikeliness of the superposition and thus not as useful for assessing similarity, especially in remote homologs.

== Algorithmic complexity ==
=== Optimal solution ===
The optimal "threading" of a protein sequence onto a known structure and the production of an optimal multiple sequence alignment have been shown to be NP-complete. However, this does not imply that the structural alignment problem is NP-complete. Strictly speaking, an optimal solution to the protein structure alignment problem is only known for certain protein structure similarity measures, such as the measures used in protein structure prediction experiments, GDT_TS and MaxSub. These measures can be rigorously optimized using an algorithm capable of maximizing the number of atoms in two proteins that can be superimposed under a predefined distance cutoff. Unfortunately, the algorithm for optimal solution is not practical, since its running time depends not only on the lengths but also on the intrinsic geometry of input proteins.

=== Approximate solution ===
Approximate polynomial-time algorithms for structural alignment that produce a family of "optimal" solutions within an approximation parameter for a given scoring function have been developed. Although these algorithms theoretically classify the approximate protein structure alignment problem as "tractable", they are still computationally too expensive for large-scale protein structure analysis. As a consequence, practical algorithms that converge to the global solutions of the alignment, given a scoring function, do not exist. Most algorithms are, therefore, heuristic, but algorithms that guarantee the convergence to at least local maximizers of the scoring functions, and are practical, have been developed.

== Representation of structures ==
Protein structures have to be represented in some coordinate-independent space to make them comparable. This is typically achieved by constructing a sequence-to-sequence matrix or series of matrices that encompass comparative metrics: rather than absolute distances relative to a fixed coordinate space. An intuitive representation is the distance matrix, which is a two-dimensional matrix containing all pairwise distances between some subset of the atoms in each structure (such as the alpha carbons). The matrix increases in dimensionality as the number of structures to be simultaneously aligned increases. Reducing the protein to a coarse metric such as secondary structure elements (SSEs) or structural fragments can also produce sensible alignments, despite the loss of information from discarding distances, as noise is also discarded. Choosing a representation to facilitate computation is critical to developing an efficient alignment mechanism.

== Methods ==
Structural alignment techniques have been used in comparing individual structures or sets of structures as well as in the production of "all-to-all" comparison databases that measure the divergence between every pair of structures present in the Protein Data Bank (PDB). Such databases are used to classify proteins by their fold.

=== DALI ===
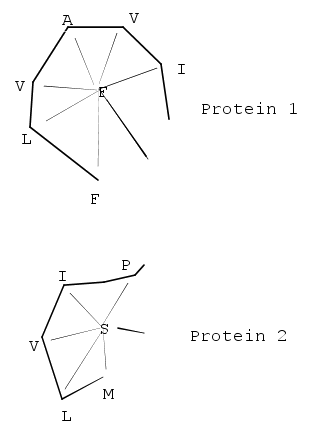
Illustration of the atom-to-atom vectors calculated in SSAP. From these vectors a series of vector differences, e.g., between (FA) in Protein 1 and (SI) in Protein 2 would be constructed. The two sequences are plotted on the two dimensions of a matrix to form a difference matrix between the two proteins. Dynamic programming is applied to all possible difference matrices to construct a series of optimal local alignment paths that are then summed to form the summary matrix, on which a second round of dynamic programming is performed.

A common and popular structural alignment method is the DALI, or Distance-matrix ALIgnment method, which breaks the input structures into hexapeptide fragments and calculates a distance matrix by evaluating the contact patterns between successive fragments. Secondary structure features that involve residues that are contiguous in sequence appear on the matrix's main diagonal; other diagonals in the matrix reflect spatial contacts between residues that are not near each other in the sequence. When these diagonals are parallel to the main diagonal, the features they represent are parallel; when they are perpendicular, their features are antiparallel. This representation is memory-intensive because the features in the square matrix are symmetrical (and thus redundant) about the main diagonal.

When two proteins' distance matrices share the same or similar features in approximately the same positions, they can be said to have similar folds with similar-length loops connecting their secondary structure elements. DALI's actual alignment process requires a similarity search after the two proteins' distance matrices are built; this is normally conducted via a series of overlapping submatrices of size 6x6. Submatrix matches are then reassembled into a final alignment via a standard score-maximization algorithm — the original version of DALI used a Monte Carlo simulation to maximize a structural similarity score that is a function of the distances between putative corresponding atoms. In particular, more distant atoms within corresponding features are exponentially downweighted to reduce the effects of noise introduced by loop mobility, helix torsions, and other minor structural variations. Because DALI relies on an all-to-all distance matrix, it can account for the possibility that structurally aligned features might appear in different orders within the two sequences being compared.

The DALI method has also been used to construct a database known as FSSP (Fold classification based on Structure-Structure alignment of Proteins, or Families of Structurally Similar Proteins) in which all known protein structures are aligned with each other to determine their structural neighbors and fold classification. There is a searchable database based on DALI as well as a downloadable program and web search based on a standalone version known as DaliLite.

=== Combinatorial extension ===
The combinatorial extension (CE) method is similar to DALI in that it too breaks each structure in the query set into a series of fragments that it then attempts to reassemble into a complete alignment. A series of pairwise combinations of fragments called aligned fragment pairs, or AFPs, are used to define a similarity matrix through which an optimal path is generated to identify the final alignment. Only AFPs that meet given criteria for local similarity are included in the matrix as a means of reducing the necessary search space and thereby increasing efficiency. A number of similarity metrics are possible; the original definition of the CE method included only structural superpositions and inter-residue distances but has since been expanded to include local environmental properties such as secondary structure, solvent exposure, hydrogen-bonding patterns, and dihedral angles.

An alignment path is calculated as the optimal path through the similarity matrix by linearly progressing through the sequences and extending the alignment with the next possible high-scoring AFP pair. The initial AFP pair that nucleates the alignment can occur at any point in the sequence matrix. Extensions then proceed with the next AFP that meets given distance criteria restricting the alignment to low gap sizes. The size of each AFP and the maximum gap size are required input parameters but are usually set to empirically determined values of 8 and 30 respectively. Like DALI and SSAP, CE has been used to construct an all-to-all fold classification database from the known protein structures in the PDB.

The RCSB PDB has recently released an updated version of CE, Mammoth, and FATCAT as part of the RCSB PDB Protein Comparison Tool. It provides a new variation of CE that can detect circular permutations in protein structures.

=== Mammoth ===
MAMMOTH approaches the alignment problem from a different objective than almost all other methods. Rather than trying to find an alignment that maximally superimposes the largest number of residues, it seeks the subset of the structural alignment least likely to occur by chance. To do this it marks a local motif alignment with flags to indicate which residues simultaneously satisfy more stringent criteria: 1) Local structure overlap 2) regular secondary structure 3) 3D-superposition 4) same ordering in primary sequence. It converts the statistics of the number of residues with high-confidence matches and the size of the protein to compute an Expectation value for the outcome by chance. It excels at matching remote homologs, particularly structures generated by ab initio structure prediction to structure families such as SCOP, because it emphasizes extracting a statistically reliable sub alignment and not in achieving the maximal sequence alignment or maximal 3D superposition.

For every overlapping window of 7 consecutive residues it computes the set of displacement direction unit vectors between adjacent C-alpha residues. All-against-all local motifs are compared based on the URMS score. These values become the pair alignment score entries for dynamic programming which produces a seed pair-wise residue alignment. The second phase uses a modified MaxSub algorithm: a single 7 reside aligned pair in each proteins is used to orient the two full length protein structures to maximally superimpose these just these 7 C-alpha, then in this orientation it scans for any additional aligned pairs that are close in 3D. It re-orients the structures to superimpose this expanded set and iterates until no more pairs coincide in 3D. This process is restarted for every 7 residue window in the seed alignment. The output is the maximal number of atoms found from any of these initial seeds. This statistic is converted to a calibrated E-value for the similarity of the proteins.

Mammoth makes no attempt to re-iterate the initial alignment or extend the high quality sub-subset. Therefore, the seed alignment it displays can't be fairly compared to DALI or TM align as it was formed simply as a heuristic to prune the search space. (It can be used if one wants an alignment based solely on local structure-motif similarity agnostic of long range rigid body atomic alignment.) Because of that same parsimony, it is well over ten times faster than DALI, CE and TM-align. It is often used in conjunction with these slower tools to pre-screen large data bases to extract the just the best E-value related structures for more exhaustive superposition or expensive calculations.

It has been particularly successful at analyzing "decoy" structures from ab initio structure prediction. These decoys are notorious for getting local fragment motif structure correct, and forming some kernels of correct 3D tertiary structure but getting the full length tertiary structure wrong. In this twilight remote homology regime, Mammoth's e-values for the CASP protein structure prediction evaluation have been shown to be significantly more correlated with human ranking than SSAP or DALI. Mammoths ability to extract the multi-criteria partial overlaps with proteins of known structure and rank these with proper E-values, combined with its speed facilitates scanning vast numbers of decoy models against the PDB data base for identifying the most likely correct decoys based on their remote homology to known proteins.

=== SSAP ===
The SSAP (Sequential Structure Alignment Program) method uses double dynamic programming to produce a structural alignment based on atom-to-atom vectors in structure space. Instead of the alpha carbons typically used in structural alignment, SSAP constructs its vectors from the beta carbons for all residues except glycine, a method which thus takes into account the rotameric state of each residue as well as its location along the backbone. SSAP works by first constructing a series of inter-residue distance vectors between each residue and its nearest non-contiguous neighbors on each protein. A series of matrices are then constructed containing the vector differences between neighbors for each pair of residues for which vectors were constructed. Dynamic programming applied to each resulting matrix determines a series of optimal local alignments which are then summed into a "summary" matrix to which dynamic programming is applied again to determine the overall structural alignment.

SSAP originally produced only pairwise alignments but has since been extended to multiple alignments as well. It has been applied in an all-to-all fashion to produce a hierarchical fold classification scheme known as CATH (Class, Architecture, Topology, Homology), which has been used to construct the CATH Protein Structure Classification database.

=== Alphabet methods ===
A special class of protein structural alignment programs convert the input structure into a sequence of letters describing the structure. This allows methods from sequence alignment to be translated into this field to enable more efficient searching, and in some implementations, to also align and superimpose in real 3D space.

- The simplest method only considers the position of the backbone. The input is divided into groups of four residues and each group is described by the closest one-letter descriptor. To further reuse protein-based tools, 20 letters are chosen.
- Foldseek uses the 3D interaction (3Di) alphabet, which classifies the relationship between one residue's Cα atom and its spatially closest residue into 20 letters. Each residue of the input structure receives one letter. The similarities between letters is defined by a substitution matrix. 3Di alphabet and substitution matrix were trained using residue pairs obtained from TM-align alignments of SCOPe structures. TM-align includes secondary-structure-based initialization, using Cα-based assignment rules whose parameters were optimized against DSSP assignments. The ProstT5 study further reported that 12 of the 20 3Di states exhibited a greater than 70% preference for a particular DSSP-derived secondary-structure class, providing empirical evidence that 3Di states encode information associated with secondary structure. Foldseek is able to provide a high sensitivity similar to typical structural alignment while being hundreds of times faster. It is able to search, align, and superimpose.
- Reseek represents each residue and its structural context in a discrete feature vector, effectively creating an alphabet of 10^{11} letters. The similarity between each feature vector is defined component-wise using pre-collected data. This method also allows multiple structure alignment (MUSCLE-3D).

== Recent developments ==
Improvements in structural alignment methods constitute an active area of research, and new or modified methods are often proposed that are claimed to offer advantages over the older and more widely distributed techniques. A recent example, TM-align, uses a novel method for weighting its distance matrix, to which standard dynamic programming is then applied. The weighting is proposed to accelerate the convergence of dynamic programming and correct for effects arising from alignment lengths. In a benchmarking study, TM-align has been reported to improve in both speed and accuracy over DALI and CE.

Other promising methods of structural alignment are local structural alignment methods. These provide comparison of pre-selected parts of proteins (e.g. binding sites, user-defined structural motifs) against binding sites or whole-protein structural databases. The MultiBind and MAPPIS servers allow the identification of common spatial arrangements of physicochemical properties such as H-bond donor, acceptor, aliphatic, aromatic or hydrophobic in a set of user provided protein binding sites defined by interactions with small molecules (MultiBind) or in a set of user-provided protein–protein interfaces (MAPPIS). Others provide comparison of entire protein structures against a number of user submitted structures or against a large database of protein structures in reasonable time (ProBiS). Unlike global alignment approaches, local structural alignment approaches are suited to detection of locally conserved patterns of functional groups, which often appear in binding sites and have significant involvement in ligand binding. As an example, comparing G-Losa, a local structure alignment tool, with TM-align, a global structure alignment based method. While G-Losa predicts drug-like ligands' positions in single-chain protein targets more precisely than TM-align, the overall success rate of TM-align is better.

However, as algorithmic improvements and computer performance have erased purely technical deficiencies in older approaches, it has become clear that there is no one universal criterion for the 'optimal' structural alignment. TM-align, for instance, is particularly robust in quantifying comparisons between sets of proteins with great disparities in sequence lengths, but it only indirectly captures hydrogen bonding or secondary structure order conservation which might be better metrics for alignment of evolutionarily related proteins. Thus recent developments have focused on optimizing particular attributes such as speed, quantification of scores, correlation to alternative gold standards, or tolerance of imperfection in structural data or ab initio structural models. An alternative methodology that is gaining popularity is to use the consensus of various methods to ascertain proteins structural similarities.

== RNA structural alignment ==
Structural alignment techniques have traditionally been applied exclusively to proteins, as the primary biological macromolecules that assume characteristic three-dimensional structures. However, large RNA molecules also form characteristic tertiary structures, which are mediated primarily by hydrogen bonds formed between base pairs as well as base stacking. Functionally similar noncoding RNA molecules can be especially difficult to extract from genomics data because structure is more strongly conserved than sequence in RNA as well as in proteins, and the more limited alphabet of RNA decreases the information content of any given nucleotide at any given position.

However, because of the increasing interest in RNA structures and because of the growth of the number of experimentally determined 3D RNA structures, few RNA structure similarity methods have been developed recently. One of those methods is, e.g., SETTER which decomposes each RNA structure into smaller parts called general secondary structure units (GSSUs). GSSUs are subsequently aligned and these partial alignments are merged into the final RNA structure alignment and scored. The method has been implemented into the SETTER webserver.

A recent method for pairwise structural alignment of RNA sequences with low sequence identity has been published and implemented in the program FOLDALIGN. However, this method is not truly analogous to protein structural alignment techniques because it computationally predicts the structures of the RNA input sequences rather than requiring experimentally determined structures as input. Although computational prediction of the protein folding process has not been particularly successful to date, RNA structures without pseudoknots can often be sensibly predicted using free energy-based scoring methods that account for base pairing and stacking.

== Software ==
Choosing a software tool for structural alignment can be a challenge due to the large variety of available packages that differ significantly in methodology and reliability. A partial solution to this problem was presented in and made publicly accessible through the ProCKSI webserver. A more complete list of currently available and freely distributed structural alignment software can be found in structural alignment software.

Properties of some structural alignment servers and software packages are summarized and tested with examples at Structural Alignment Tools in Proteopedia.Org.

== See also ==
- Multiple sequence alignment
- List of sequence alignment software
- Structural Classification of Proteins
- SuperPose
- Protein superfamily
