= Phytepsin =

Identifiers
- EC no.: 3.4.23.40
- CAS no.: 219715-98-7

Databases
- IntEnz: IntEnz view
- BRENDA: BRENDA entry
- ExPASy: NiceZyme view
- KEGG: KEGG entry
- MetaCyc: metabolic pathway
- PRIAM: profile
- PDB structures: RCSB PDB PDBe PDBsum
Search
- PMC: articles
- PubMed: articles
- NCBI: proteins

Phytepsin

Identifiers
- Symbol: phytepsin
- InterPro: IPR033869
- CDD: cd06098

Phytepsin (EC 3.4.23.40) is an enzyme. This enzyme catalyses the following chemical reaction

Prefers hydrophobic residues Phe, Val, Ile, Leu, and Ala at P1 and P1', but also cleaves -Phe-Asp- and -Asp-Asp- bonds in 2S albumin from plant seeds

This enzyme is present in barley grain and other plants. It is an aspartic protease with a plant-specific insert.
