= Combined saposin deficiency =

Combined Saposin Deficiency
- Other names: Prosaposin Defiency, Combined Sap Deficiency, PSAPD
- PSAPD is inherited in an autosomal recessive fashion
- Symptoms: Respiratory failure, hepatosplenomegaly, poor feeding, myoclonus, hyperkinesia, seizures, leukodystrophy, hypotonia, abnormal eye movement, neuronal loss
- Causes: Genetic mutations
- Diagnostic method: Genetic testing

Combined Saposin Defiency is a very rare metabolic and genetic disorder that is caused by the mutation in a gene PSAP. This disease belongs to Lysosomal Storage Diseases(LSDs). Because of complete saposin deficiency, it can cause clinical features of 4 diseases(Gaucher's Disease, Metachromatic Leukodystrophy, Farber's Disease, Krabbe's Disease) to be apparent.

== Cause ==
PSAPD is caused by mutations in a PSAP gene, which is located on the long arm of chromosome 10 (10q22.1).

PSAPD is inherited in an Autosomal Recessive fashion.

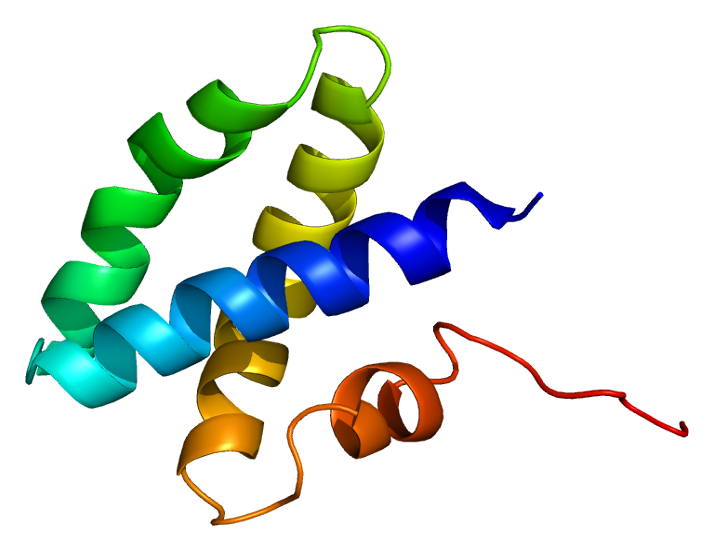
A photo showing structure of Prosaposin

== Symptoms ==
Symptoms usually start in infancy or in neonatal age. The signs of this disease are respiratory failure, hepatosplenomegaly, poor feeding, myoclonus, hyperkinetic movements, clonic seizures, leukodystrophy, hypotonia, abnormality of eye movement and a neuronal loss.

Optic atrophy was only reported in 1 patient

== Pathophysiology ==
It is known that Prosaposin is a precursor of a Saposin A,B,C,D. Saposin A is needed to activate galactocerbroside hydrolysis, Saposin B for sulphatide hydrolysis activation, Saposin C for glucocerebroside hydrolysis, Saposin D might activate hydrolysis of ceramide.

According to one study, Prosaposin might be involved in neuron and glial protection by extracellular secretion and activation of some G protein-coupled receptors.

In conclusion, PSAPD might not only cause accumulation of some sphingolipids, but also it can cause neuronal survival crisis (by mechanism mentioned above).

== Prevalence ==
Prevalence is unknown but 10 cases of this diseases had been reported.

== Diagnosis ==
The study of sphingolipids in urine sediment (It shows combined massive elevation of globotriaosylceramide (Gb3), sulphatide and some other sphingolipids) might be useful for a correct orientation towards diagnosis, also bone marrow/liver's biopsies usually show Gaucher-like macrophages. For the final diagnosis PSAP gene would be tested for mutations.

== Prognosis ==
Unfortunately, prognosis is poor for this disease.

== History ==
It was first reported by Harzer et al. in 1989
