= PSAPL1 =

Protein-coding gene in the species Homo sapiens

Identifiers
- Aliases: PSAPL1, prosaposin-like 1 (gene/pseudogene), prosaposin like 1 (gene/pseudogene), prosaposin like 1
- External IDs: MGI: 1924193; HomoloGene: 105928; GeneCards: PSAPL1; OMA:PSAPL1 - orthologs

Gene location (Human)
Chr.	Chromosome 4 (human)
Band	4p16.1	Start	7,430,285 bp
Band	4p16.1	End	7,434,930 bp

Gene location (Mouse)
Chr.	Chromosome 5 (mouse)
Band	5|5 B3	Start	36,361,365 bp
Band	5|5 B3	End	36,363,912 bp
RNA expression pattern
Bgee	Human / Mouse (ortholog); Top expressed in: skin of thigh; skin of abdomen; vulva; nipple; skin of hip; human penis; lower lobe of lung; body of stomach; pharynx; right testis / Top expressed in: skin of external ear; pyloric antrum; epithelium of stomach; lip; skin of back; esophagus; conjunctival fornix; superior surface of tongue; condyle; mucous cell of stomach; More reference expression data
BioGPS	n/a
Gene ontology
Molecular function	enzyme activator activity; G protein-coupled receptor binding
Cellular component	extracellular region; lysosome; extracellular space; cytoplasm; cytosol
Biological process	regulation of lipid metabolic process; prostate gland growth; adenylate cyclase-inhibiting G protein-coupled receptor signaling pathway; epithelial cell differentiation involved in prostate gland development; sphingolipid metabolic process; lipid metabolism; positive regulation of catalytic activity
Sources:Amigo / QuickGO
Orthologs
Species	Human	Mouse
Entrez	768239	76943
Ensembl	ENSG00000178597	ENSMUSG00000043430
UniProt	Q6NUJ1	Q8C1C1
RefSeq (mRNA)	NM_001085382	NM_175249
RefSeq (protein)	NP_001078851	NP_780458
Location (UCSC)	Chr 4: 7.43 – 7.43 Mb	Chr 5: 36.36 – 36.36 Mb
PubMed search
- Wikidata
View/Edit Human	View/Edit Mouse

Proactivator polypeptide-like 1 is a protein in humans that is encoded by the PSAPL1 gene. It is a member of the saposin family of proteins.
