= Degradative enzyme =

A degradative enzyme is an enzyme (in a broader sense a protein) which degrades biological molecules. Some examples of degradative enzymes:

- Lipase, which digests lipids,
- Carbohydrases, which digest carbohydrates (e.g., sugars),
- Proteases, which digest proteins,
- Nucleases, which digest nucleic acids.
- Cathelicidins, antimicrobial polypeptides found in lysosomes.

== See also ==
- Hydrolase
