= Prosaposin =

Protein-coding gene in the species Homo sapiens

PSAP
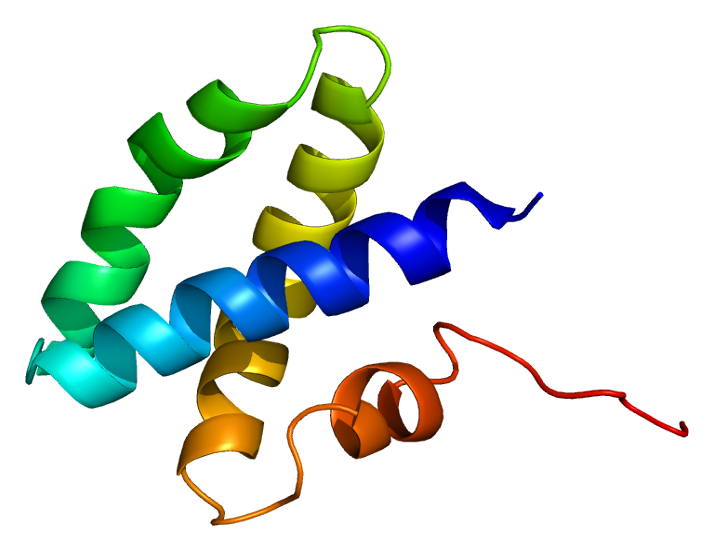

Identifiers
- Aliases: PSAP, GLBA, SAP1, prosaposin, SAP2, PSAPD, PARK24
- External IDs: OMIM: 176801; MGI: 97783; GeneCards: PSAP
Available structures
PDB	Ortholog search: PDBe RCSB
PDB	List of PDB id codes 1M12, 1N69, 1SN6, 2DOB, 2GTG, 2QYP, 2R0R, 2R1Q, 2RB3, 2Z9A, 3BQP, 3BQQ, 4DDJ, 4UEX, 4V2O

Gene location (Human)
Chr.	Chromosome 10 (human)
Band	10q22.1	Start	71,816,298 bp
Band	10q22.1	End	71,851,251 bp

Gene location (Mouse)
Chr.	Chromosome 10 (mouse)
Band	10 B4|10 30.02 cM	Start	60,113,449 bp
Band	10 B4|10 30.02 cM	End	60,138,376 bp
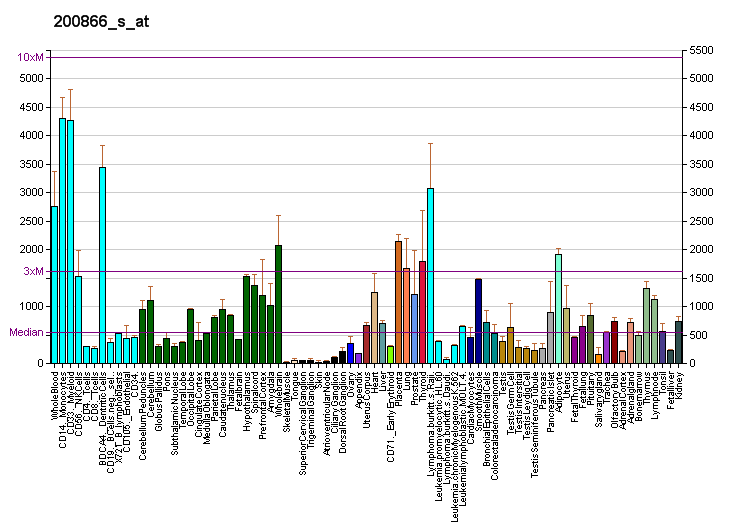

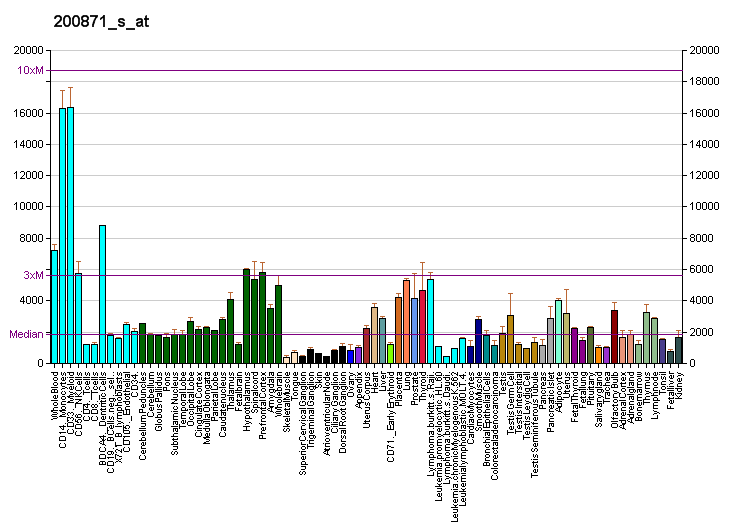
RNA expression pattern
Bgee	Human / Mouse (ortholog); Top expressed in: monocyte; tendon of biceps brachii; right adrenal cortex; gallbladder; internal globus pallidus; stromal cell of endometrium; Achilles tendon; left adrenal gland; visceral pleura; left adrenal cortex / Top expressed in: stroma of bone marrow; gastrula; decidua; vestibular membrane of cochlear duct; choroid plexus of fourth ventricle; dentate gyrus of hippocampal formation granule cell; superior frontal gyrus; cerebellar cortex; mesenteric lymph nodes; primary visual cortex; More reference expression data
BioGPS	More reference expression data
Gene ontology
Molecular function	G protein-coupled receptor binding; protein binding; lipid binding; enzyme activator activity; beta-galactosidase activity; phospholipid binding; protein homodimerization activity; ganglioside GM1 binding; ganglioside GM2 binding; ganglioside GM3 binding; ganglioside GT1b binding; ganglioside GP1c binding; identical protein binding; protease binding
Cellular component	lysosomal membrane; integral component of membrane; mitochondrion; lysosomal lumen; extracellular exosome; extracellular space; lysosome; plasma membrane; azurophil granule membrane; intracellular membrane-bounded organelle; extracellular matrix; extracellular region; cytoplasm; collagen-containing extracellular matrix; late endosome
Biological process	lipid metabolism; lipid transport; epithelial cell differentiation involved in prostate gland development; regulation of MAPK cascade; glycosphingolipid metabolic process; developmental growth; adenylate cyclase-inhibiting G protein-coupled receptor signaling pathway; regulation of autophagy; positive regulation of MAPK cascade; cellular response to organic substance; negative regulation of hydrogen peroxide-induced cell death; regulation of lipid metabolic process; prostate gland growth; platelet degranulation; sphingolipid metabolic process; positive regulation of catalytic activity; neutrophil degranulation; ganglioside GM1 transport to membrane; corneocyte development; galactosylceramide catabolic process; G protein-coupled receptor signaling pathway; hearing; myelination; neuromuscular process controlling balance; positive regulation of hydrolase activity; urination; cochlea development; walking behavior; cornified envelope assembly; lysosomal transport
Sources:Amigo / QuickGO
Orthologs
Databases	NCBI: entry; OMA: entry
Species	Human	Mouse
Entrez	5660	19156
Ensembl	ENSG00000197746	ENSMUSG00000004207
UniProt	P07602; Q5BJH1	Q61207
RefSeq (mRNA)	NM_002778; NM_001042465; NM_001042466	NM_001146120; NM_001146121; NM_001146122; NM_001146123; NM_001146124 NM_011179
RefSeq (protein)	NP_001035930; NP_001035931; NP_002769; NP_002769.1	NP_001139592; NP_001139593; NP_001139594; NP_001139595; NP_001139596 NP_035309
Location (UCSC)	Chr 10: 71.82 – 71.85 Mb	Chr 10: 60.11 – 60.14 Mb
PubMed search
- Wikidata
View/Edit Human	View/Edit Mouse

Prosaposin, also known as PSAP, is a protein which in humans is encoded by the PSAP gene.

This highly conserved glycoprotein is a precursor for 4 cleavage products: saposins A, B, C, and D. Saposin is an acronym for Sphingolipid Activator PrO[S]teINs. Each domain of the precursor protein is approximately 80 amino acid residues long with nearly identical placement of cysteine residues and glycosylation sites. Saposins A-D localize primarily to the lysosomal compartment where they facilitate the catabolism of glycosphingolipids with short oligosaccharide groups. The precursor protein exists both as a secretory protein and as an integral membrane protein and has neurotrophic activities.

Saposins A–D are required for the hydrolysis of certain sphingolipids by specific lysosomal hydrolases.

== Family members ==
- Saposin A was identified as an N-terminal domain in the prosaposin cDNA prior to its isolation. It is known to stimulate the enzymatic hydrolysis of 4-methylumbelliferyl-β-glucoside, glucocerebroside, and galactocerebroside.
- Saposin B was the first to be discovered and was found to be required as a heat-stable factor for hydrolysis of sulfatides by arylsulfatase A. It is known by many different names, such as, sphingolipid activator protein-1 (SAP-1), sulfatide activator protein, GM_{1} ganglioside activator, dispersin, and nonspecific. It has been observed that this particular saposin activates many enzymes through interaction with the substrates not the enzymes themselves.
- Saposin C was the second saposin to be discovered and stimulates the hydrolysis of glycocerebroside by glycosylceramidase and galactocerebroside by galactosylceramidase.
- Saposin D is not well known due to a lack of investigation at this point in time. It was predicted from the cDNA sequence of prosaposin, like saposin A. Enzymatic stimulation is very specific for this particular glycoprotein and it not understood completely.
- GM2A (GM2 ganglioside activator) has been viewed as a member of the SAP family and has been called SAP-3 (sphingolipid activator protein 3)
Crystal structures of human saposins A-D
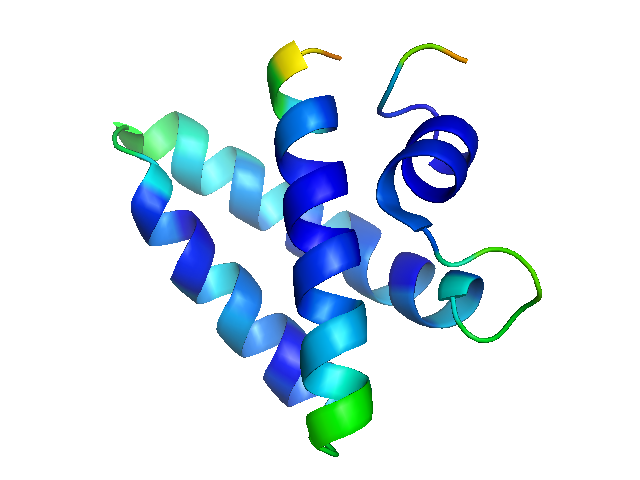
Saposin A (PDB: 2DOB).

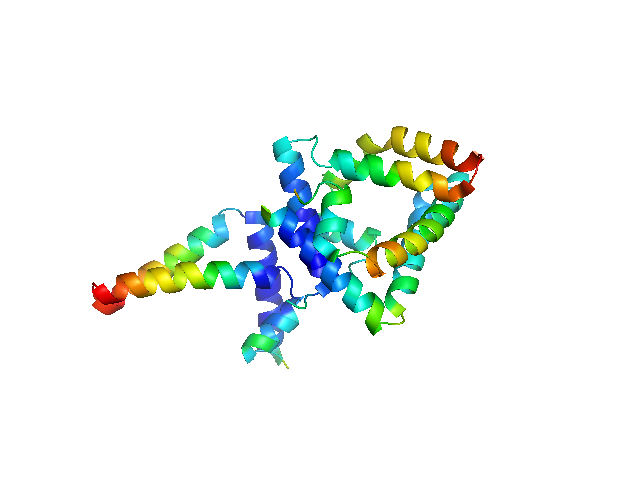
Saposin B (PDB: 1N69).

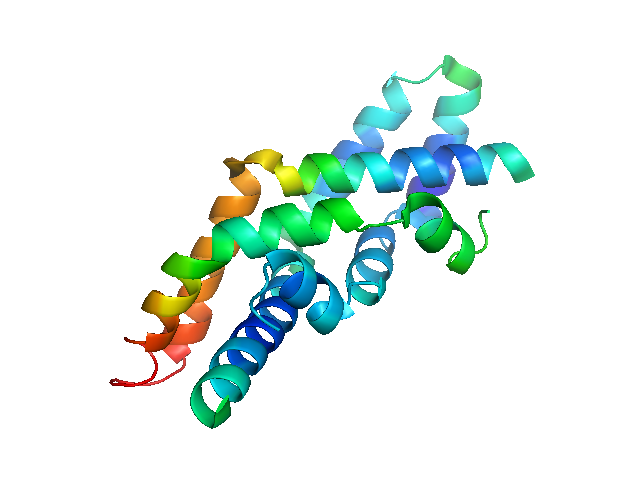
Saposin C dimer in an open conformation (PDB: 2QYP).

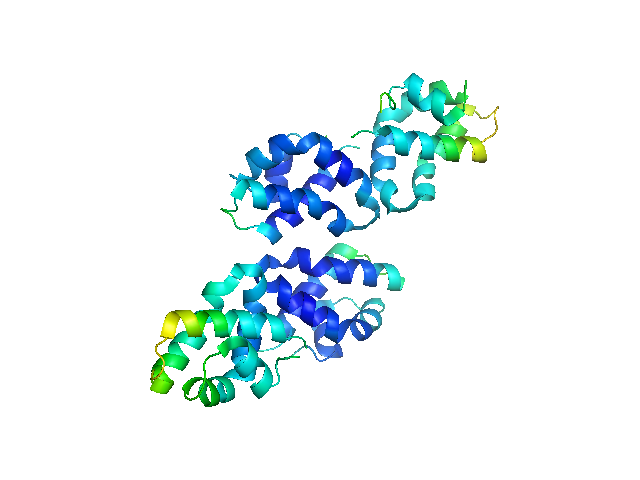
Saposin D (PDB: 2RB3).

== Structure ==
Every saposin contains about 80 amino acid residues and has six equally placed cysteines, two prolines, and a glycosylation site (two in saposin A, one each in saposins B, C, and D). Since saposins characteristics of extreme heat-stability, abundance of disulfide linkages, and resistance to most proteases, they are assumed to be extremely compact and rigidly disulfide-linked molecules. Each saposin has an α-helical structure that is seen as being important for stimulation because this structure is maximal at a pH of 4.5; which is optimal for many lysosomal hydrolases. This helical structure is seen in all (especially with the first region), but saposin has been predicted to have β-sheet configuration due to it first 24 amino acids of the N-end.

== Function ==
They probably act by isolating the lipid substrate from the membrane surroundings, thus making it more accessible to the soluble degradative enzymes. which contains four Saposin-B domains, yielding the active saposins after proteolytic cleavage, and two Saposin-A domains that are removed in the activation reaction. The Saposin-B domains also occur in other proteins, many of them active in the lysis of membranes.

== Clinical significance ==
Mutations in this gene have been associated with Gaucher disease, Tay–Sachs disease, Metachromatic leukodystrophy and Combined Saposin Deficiency.

== See also ==
- Saposin protein domain
