= GNLY =

Protein-coding gene in the species Homo sapiens

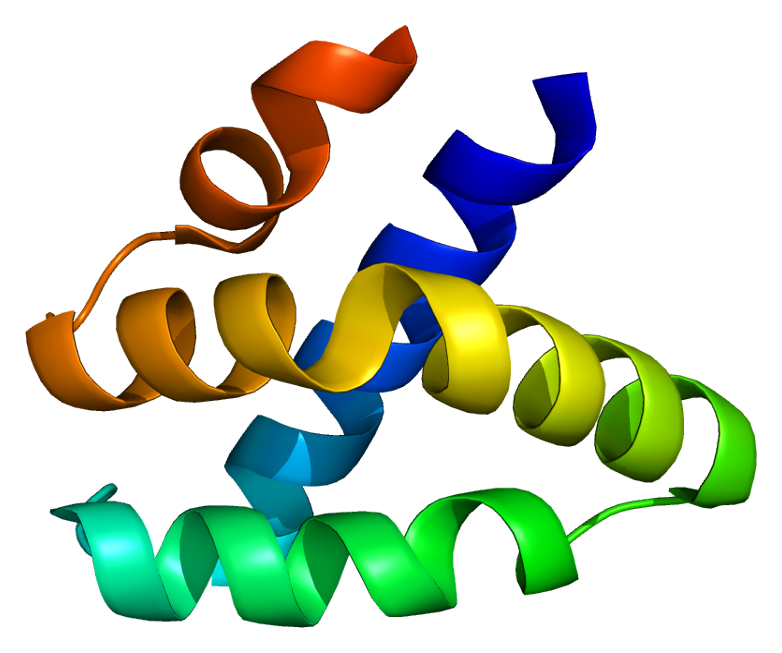

Identifiers
- Aliases: GNLY, 519, D2S69E, LAG-2, LAG2, NKG5, TLA519, granulysin
- External IDs: OMIM: 188855; GeneCards: GNLY
Available structures
PDB	Human UniProt search: PDBe RCSB
PDB	List of PDB id codes 1L9L

Gene location (Human)
Chr.	Chromosome 2 (human)
Band	2p11.2	Start	85,685,175 bp
Band	2p11.2	End	85,698,852 bp
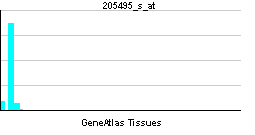

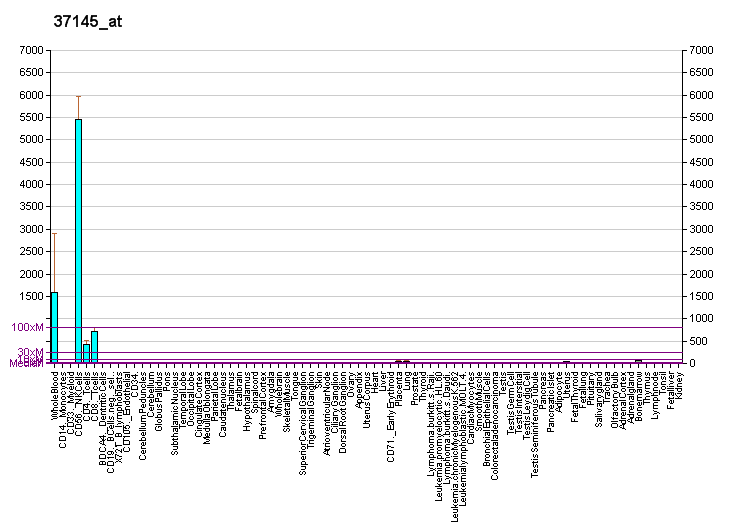
RNA expression pattern
Bgee	Human / Mouse (ortholog); Top expressed in: granulocyte; blood; decidua; spleen; bone marrow cell; apex of heart; upper lobe of left lung; right lung; right lobe of liver; mononuclear cell / n/a; More reference expression data
BioGPS	More reference expression data
Orthologs
Databases	NCBI: entry; OMA: entry
Species	Human	Mouse
Entrez	10578	n/a
Ensembl	ENSG00000115523	n/a
UniProt	P22749	n/a
RefSeq (mRNA)	NM_001302758; NM_006433; NM_012483	n/a
RefSeq (protein)	NP_001289687; NP_006424; NP_036615	n/a
Location (UCSC)	Chr 2: 85.69 – 85.7 Mb	n/a
PubMed search		n/a
- Wikidata
View/Edit Human

Granulysin (GNLY) is a protein expressed in most mammals which functions as an antimicrobial peptide released by killer lymphocytes in cytotoxic granules. It is a pore-forming peptide, as it can puncture a microbial cell wall, allowing for other death-inducing enzymes to enter the microbe and cause microptosis. GNLY is inhibited by cholesterol, and is most effective in helping to kill cholesterol-deficient microbes.

It is part of the saposin-like protein family and contains saposin protein domain, and its gene is found on the second chromosome in humans. It is distinguished by its 5 α-helical structure. Its expression is restricted to cytotoxic immune cells such as cytotoxic T cells, NK cells, NKT cells and γδ T cells. Orthologs of this protein are found in most mammal species, such as in cows and pigs, however not in rodents.

Granulysin is also an active player in many diseases, including leprosy and toxic epidermal necrolysis.

== Structure ==
Granulysin has a five alpha-helix structure, and is part of the saposin-like protein family. It is expressed in two forms: a 15 kDa precursor protein, the translation product, and a 9 kDa cytotoxic protein, which is formed after cleavage of the amino and carbonyl ends of the 15kDa protein.

The 15 kDa form consists of 145 amino acids, and is an inactive protein. It exists in its own granule after translation, and release of the protein is triggered by Protein Kinase C (PKC). Its C- and N-Termini function to properly direct the molecule to cytotoxic granules, and are subsequently cleaved once this has been achieved to prevent autolysis. 15 kDa plays other roles in immunological processes, such as in antigen-presenting cell maturation and in immune cell migration.

The 9 kDa form consists of 74 amino acids, and has a cytotoxic function. This molecule is found in cytotoxic granules, along with other cytotoxic molecules, such as granzymes and perforin. The molecule's positive charge allows for binding to phospholipids and cardiolipin, both of which can be found as epitopes on the surfaces of pathogens, and its 2nd and 3rd helices are principle players in lysing foreign or infected cells.

== Gene expression ==
GNLY gene is located on human chromosome 2 and has 5 exons, which code for a 15 kDa protein. The path to transcription has not been elucidated: transcription factors, promoter regions, and pathogen-associated molecular patterns, which likely induce the signaling pathway necessary for the eventual translation of this protein, are unknown. Granulysin is expressed in killer cells, such as cytotoxic T cells and Natural Killer (NK) cells, which hold the cytotoxic granules this protein is contained in. These cells can be found mainly in the epidermis to protect against infection spreading through the skin. In addition, high expression of Granulysin can be found in the placenta to protect fetal epithelial cells.

== Function ==
=== 15 kDa GNLY ===
The 15 kDa GNLY was originally thought to function exclusively as an inactive precursor of antimicrobial 9 kDa GNLY, however this hypothesis has been recently challenged. 15 kDa has been shown to be located in its own granules and its release is governed by PKC, unlike the 9 kDa GNLY, which is released from its granules via Ca2+. The 15 kDa also functions as an alarmin, molecules capable of starting an inflammatory response. More precisely, 15 kDa GNLY is capable of initiating differentiation of monocytes into dendritic cells. The 15 kDa form is also able to act as a chemoattractant for different cells, such as NK cells, cytotoxic T cells, helper T cells, and in higher concentrations, immature dendritic cells.

=== 9 kDa GNLY ===
The 9 kDa form functions as a pore-forming protein, as it is able to permeabilize cell membranes.The 9kDa form can cytolyze fungi, yeast, parasites, gram negative, and gram positive bacteria. This protein is also far more effective in targeting bacterial membranes than mammalian membranes, though it can target many different cell types, such as those from fungi and parasites. The 9 kDa form is also inhibited by cholesterol which is usually present in mammalian cells, but not in most pathogen cells. This all makes GNLY 1000 times less effective in pore formation in human cells than in microbe cells. However, the precise mechanisms of pore formation is not yet fully understood.

Although GNLY is able to kill pathogens by itself, usually, it cooperates with other proteins from cytotoxic granules, most notably with granzymes. When a cytotoxic cell discovers any infected cell the content of the cytotoxic granules is released by receptor-mediated exocytosis. Perforin, unlike GNLY, binds preferably to cholesterol rich membranes and permeabilizes the infected cell which allows the entry of GNLY and granzymes. GNLY then creates pores in pathogen membranes so granzymes can move into the pathogen where it can cause microptosis.

Granzymes usually cause apoptosis of the infected cell through initiation of the caspase cascade. However, apoptosis can also be initiated by GNLY, due to the presence of cardiolipin in mitochondrial membranes which allows GNLY to create pores in the membrane and causing a release of molecules like cytochrome c, which also leads to apoptosis.

== Evolution ==
GNLY orthologues have been identified in multiple species including pigs, chicken, and cattle. Out of these species (human included) only in cattle 4 functional GNLY where characterized. Generally, such gene duplication can lead to functional specification which seems to be the case of bovine GNLYs because of two reasons. First, the 4 genes are differentially expressed in different tissues. Second, some common cattle pathogens like Histophilus somni and Mannheimia haemolytica have significantly different sensitivity to each of the 4 bovine GNLY.

== Clinical significance ==
Granulysin plays a role in a myriad of diseases, where it can be a positive or negative influence on the immune response. In Leprosy, for example, Granulysin acts to prevent further infection, and infected individuals often have higher expression of killer cells expressing Granulysin. However, in diseases in which Granulysin is expressed in high concentrations individuals can have debilitating or life-threatening symptoms, most notably in autoimmune diseases where cells can be lysed by killer cells.

=== Toxic epidermal necrolysis ===
Granulysin plays a large role in Toxic Epidermal Necrolysis (TEN), a disease in which patients suffer from severe blistering, destruction of mucus tissues, fluid loss, and inflamed skin, caused by an immune response to drugs. A drug will often bind to the major histocompatibility complex type I (MHC-I) and cytotoxic T cell receptors, resulting in a cytotoxic immune response. Granulysin has been determined to be the principal player in cell death in this disease. Individuals suffering from TEN were found to have high concentrations of Granulysin in their blister fluid.

=== Cancer ===
Granulysin has also been shown to slow the progression of cancers and destroy transformed cells through apoptosis. Patients with high levels of Granulysin in blood serum are better able to fight off metastasis, and generally progression of cancer stages is slow. There is considerable evidence that the 9 kDa form is itself able to destroy tumor cells, however exactly how it does this has not been determined. One mechanism of cell destruction is through initiating calcium increase, which harms the mitochondria and increases the level of cytochrome b, and eventually causing apoptosis.
