= Carbohydrase =

Class of enzymes

Carbohydrase is the name of a set of enzymes that catalyze five types of reactions, turning carbohydrates into simple sugars, from the large family of glycosidases.

Carbohydrases are produced in the pancreas, salivary glands and small intestine, breaking down polysaccharides. This is because complex sugars are often insoluble (such as starch), and therefore breaking them down will make it easier for the sugars to be absorbed into the blood, through the wall of the small intestine. A carbohydrate is usually a compound consisting of carbon, hydrogen and oxygen. Carbohydrase facilitates the hydrolysis of polysaccharides into simpler sugars called monosaccharides.

== Examples ==
Maltase reduces maltose into glucose: C_{12}H_{22}O_{11} + H_{2}O → 2C_{6}H_{12}O_{6}
Maltose + Water → α-Glucose

α-amylase breaks starch down into maltose and dextrin, by breaking down large, insoluble starch molecules into soluble starches (amylodextrin, erythrodextrin, and achrodextrin) producing successively smaller starches and ultimately maltose.

β-amylase catalyses the hydrolysis of starch into maltose by the process of removing successive maltose units from the non-reducing ends of the chains.

γ-Amylase will cleave the last α(1–4)glycosidic linkages at the nonreducing end of amylose and amylopectin, yielding glucose.
