= List of online databases =

This is a list of online databases accessible via the Internet.

== A ==
- Abandoned & Little-Known Airfields
- Academic OneFile
- Acronym Finder
- Adult Film Database
- Aeiou Encyclopedia
- Airiti Inc
- Airliners.net
- All Media Guide
- Allgame (down)
- Allmovie
- Allmusic
- American National Corpus
- Animal Diversity Web
- Animal Genome Size Database
- Animator.ru
- Arachne
- ArchINFORM
- Archive site
- ArtCyclopedia
- Amazon.com
- Aviation Safety Reporting System

== B ==
- Bank of English
- Beilstein database
- BiblioPage.com
- Bibliotek.dk
- Big Cartoon DataBase
- Big Comic Book DataBase
- Bioinformatic Harvester
- BoardGameGeek
- BrickLink

== C ==
- CAMPUS
- Casio Databank
- Catholic-Hierarchy.org
- CellarTracker
- ChEBI
- Chemical Abstracts Service
- Chessgames.com
- China Pollution Map Database
- CIDOB Foundation
- Cinema and Science
- CiteSeer
- ClassRanked.com
- Collection of Computer Science Bibliographies
- Comic book price guide
- Comics Buyer's Guide
- Conformational dynamics data bank
- Credo Reference
- Croatian National Corpus
- Current Biography

== D ==
- DBLP
- DIALOG
- Dictionary of Canadian Biography
- Discogs
- Dortmund Data Bank

== E ==
- Earth Human STR Allele Frequencies Database
- Eiga.com
- ELDIS
- Electron microscopy data bank
- EMBASE
- Encyclopedia Astronautica
- Encyclopedia Mythica
- English Short Title Catalogue
- Entrez
- Everyone's a Critic

== F ==
- Factiva
- Facts on File
- Fashion Model Directory
- Filmarchives online
- Filmweb
- Find a Grave
- FINDbase (the Frequency of INherited Disorders database)
- FishBase
- Flags of the World
- Flora Europaea

== G ==
- Gallica
- GameRankings
- GeneNetwork
- GeoNames
- Gesamtkatalog der Wiegendrucke
- Getty Thesaurus of Geographic Names
- Golm Metabolome Database
- Google
- Grand Comics Database

== H ==
- Hazardous Substances Data Bank
- History of Geology and Mining (Information System)
- Hong Kong Movie DataBase
- Hoover's
- HotPads.com

== I ==
- IGDB (Internet Games Database)
- IMDb (Internet Movie Database)
- INDUCKS
- IndexMaster
- Informit (database)
- Inorganic Crystal Structure Database
- Interment.net
- Internet Adult Film Database
- Internet Archive
- Internet Broadway Database
- Internet Movie Cars Database
- Internet Movie Firearms Database
- Internet Off-Broadway Database
- Internet Public Library
- Internet Speculative Fiction Database
- Internet Theatre Database
- International Tree-Ring Data Bank

== J ==
- Jewish Virtual Library
- Jointly Administered Knowledge Environment
- JSTOR

== K ==
- Kdo byl kdo
- Killer List of Videogames

== L ==
- Lattes
- Lesson Planet
- LexisNexis
- Liquipedia
- The Literary Encyclopedia
- Lumiere

== M ==
- Media Bias/Fact Check
- MedlinePlus
- Metacritic
- Metropolitan Travel Survey Archive
- MICAD
- Mindat.org
- MobyGames
- ModDB (Mod Database)
- Movie Review Query Engine
- Moviemistakes.com
- MovieTome
- MusicBrainz
- MyAnimeList

== N ==
- Names Database
- NNDB
- National Trauma Data Bank

== O ==
- Omniglot
- On-Line Encyclopedia of Integer Sequences
- Open Directory Project (ODP)
- Open Source Vulnerability Database

== P ==
- Paradisec
- PHI-base
- Philosophy Research Index
- Plant DNA C-values Database
- Plants for a Future
- Price guide
- ProBiS
- ProQuest
- Protein Data Bank
- Proteomics Identifications Database
- PsycINFO
- PubChem
- PubMed Central

== Q ==
- Questia – defunct

== R ==
- Rate Your Music
- REBASE Restriction Enzyme Database
- RedLightGreen
- Reptile Database
- Roller Coaster DataBase
- Roud Folk Song Index

== S ==
- Scots Law Times
- SeatGuru
- Seshat: Global History Databank
- Sharecare
- Sherdog
- The Simpsons Archive
- The Skyscraper Center
- SmealSearch
- Star Wars Databank
- Svenskt Diplomatarium

== T ==
- TCM Movie Database
- Textfiles.com
- TheTVDB
- Tocsearch
- TOSEC
- Transterm
- Truthfinder
- TV.com

== U ==
- Uchronia: The Alternate History List
- Ultimate Guitar Archive

== V ==
- VET-Bib
- Virtuoso Universal Server

== W ==
- Web of Science
- Whitepages (company)
- Who's Who (UK)
- WinCustomize
- Wind ENergy Data & Information (WENDI) Gateway
- Wikidata
- World Biographical Information System Online
- World Wide Molecular Matrix
- WorldCat

== Z ==
- Zaask
- Zabasearch.com
- Zillow
- ZINC database

== See also ==
- List of academic databases and search engines
- List of biodiversity databases
- List of chemical databases
- List of neuroscience databases
- List of ontologies
