= Genetic disorder =

Health problem from genome abnormalities

- Diagram featuring examples of a disease located on each chromosome
- Specialty: Medical genetics

A genetic disorder is a health problem caused by one or more abnormalities in the genome. It can be caused by a mutation in a single gene (monogenic) or multiple genes (polygenic) or by a chromosome abnormality. Although polygenic disorders are the most common, the term is mostly used when discussing disorders with a single genetic cause, either in a gene or chromosome. The mutation responsible can occur spontaneously before embryonic development (a de novo mutation), or it can be inherited from two parents who are carriers of a faulty gene (autosomal recessive inheritance) or from a parent with the disorder (autosomal dominant inheritance). When the genetic disorder is inherited from one or both parents, it is also classified as a hereditary disease. Some disorders are caused by a mutation on the X chromosome and have X-linked inheritance. Very few disorders are inherited on the Y chromosome or mitochondrial DNA (due to their size).

There are well over 6,000 known genetic disorders, and new genetic disorders are constantly being described in medical literature. More than 600 genetic disorders are treatable. Approximately 1 person in every 50 people is affected by a known single-gene disorder, while 1 in 263 is affected by a chromosomal disorder. About 65% of people have some kind of health problem as a result of congenital genetic mutations. Due to the significantly large number of genetic disorders, around 4.76% of people are affected by a genetic disorder classified as "rare" (usually defined as affecting fewer than 1 in 2,000 people). Most genetic disorders are rare in themselves.

Genetic disorders are present before birth, and some genetic disorders produce birth defects, but birth defects can also be developmental rather than hereditary. The opposite of a hereditary disease is an acquired disease. Most cancers, although they involve genetic mutations to a small proportion of cells in the body, are acquired diseases. Some cancer syndromes, however, are caused by BRCA mutations, are hereditary genetic disorders.

== Single-gene ==
Prevalence of some single-gene disorders
Disorder prevalence (approximate)
Autosomal dominant
Familial hypercholesterolemia	1 in 500
Myotonic dystrophy type 1	1 in 2,100
Neurofibromatosis type I	1 in 2,500
Hereditary spherocytosis	1 in 5,000
Marfan syndrome	1 in 4,000
Huntington's disease	1 in 15,000
Autosomal recessive
Sickle cell anaemia	1 in 625
Cystic fibrosis	1 in 2,000
Tay–Sachs disease	1 in 3,000
Phenylketonuria	1 in 12,000
Autosomal recessive polycystic kidney disease	1 in 20,000
Mucopolysaccharidoses	1 in 25,000
Lysosomal acid lipase deficiency	1 in 40,000
Glycogen storage diseases	1 in 50,000
Galactosemia	1 in 57,000
X-linked
Duchenne muscular dystrophy	1 in 5,000
Hemophilia	1 in 10,000
Values are for liveborn infants

A single-gene disorder (or monogenic disorder) is the result of a single mutated gene. Single-gene disorders can be passed on to subsequent generations in several ways. Genomic imprinting and uniparental disomy, however, may affect inheritance patterns. The divisions between recessive and dominant types are not "hard and fast", although the divisions between autosomal and X-linked types are (since the latter types are distinguished purely based on the chromosomal location of the gene). For example, the common form of dwarfism, achondroplasia, is typically considered a dominant disorder, but children with two genes for achondroplasia have a severe and usually lethal skeletal disorder, one that achondroplasics(ones affected with achondroplasia) could be considered carriers for. Sickle cell anemia is also considered a recessive condition, but heterozygous carriers have increased resistance to malaria in early childhood, which could be described as a related dominant condition. When a couple where one partner or both are affected or carriers of a single-gene disorder wish to have a child, they can do so through in vitro fertilization, which enables preimplantation genetic diagnosis to occur to check whether the embryo has the genetic disorder.

Most congenital metabolic disorders known as inborn errors of metabolism result from single-gene defects. Many such single-gene defects can decrease the fitness of affected people and are therefore present in the population in lower frequencies compared to what would be expected based on simple probabilistic calculations.

=== Autosomal dominant ===
Only one mutated copy of the gene will be necessary for a person to be affected by an autosomal dominant disorder. Each affected person usually has one affected parent. The chance a child will inherit the mutated gene is 50%. Autosomal dominant conditions sometimes have reduced penetrance, which means although only one mutated copy is needed, not all individuals who inherit that mutation go on to develop the disease. Examples of this type of disorder are Huntington's disease, neurofibromatosis type 1, neurofibromatosis type 2, Marfan syndrome, hereditary nonpolyposis colorectal cancer, hereditary multiple exostoses (a highly penetrant autosomal dominant disorder), tuberous sclerosis, Von Willebrand disease, and acute intermittent porphyria. Birth defects are also called congenital anomalies.

=== Autosomal recessive ===
Two copies of the gene must be mutated for a person to be affected by an autosomal recessive disorder. An affected person usually has unaffected parents who each carry a single copy of the mutated gene and are referred to as genetic carriers. Each parent with a defective gene normally do not have symptoms. Two unaffected people who each carry one copy of the mutated gene have a 25% risk with each pregnancy of having a child affected by the disorder. Examples of this type of disorder are albinism, medium-chain acyl-CoA dehydrogenase deficiency, cystic fibrosis, sickle cell disease, Tay–Sachs disease, Niemann–Pick disease, spinal muscular atrophy, and Roberts syndrome. Certain other phenotypes, such as wet versus dry earwax, are also determined in an autosomal recessive fashion. Some autosomal recessive disorders are common because, in the past, carrying one of the faulty genes led to a slight protection against an infectious disease or toxin such as tuberculosis or malaria. Such disorders include cystic fibrosis, sickle cell disease, phenylketonuria and thalassaemia.

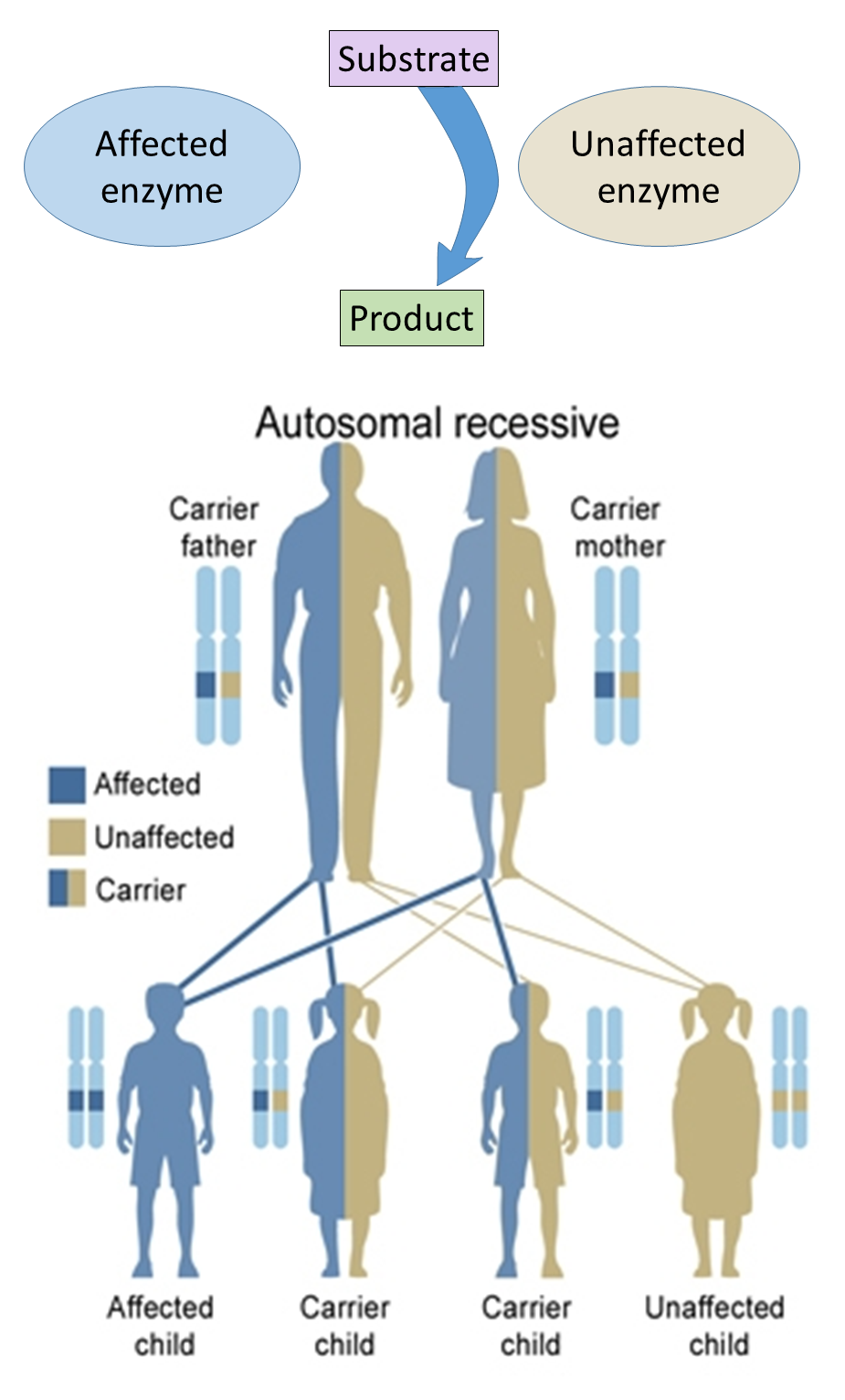
Hereditary defects in enzymes are generally inherited in an autosomal fashion because there are more non-X chromosomes than X-chromosomes, and a recessive fashion because the enzymes from the unaffected genes are generally sufficient to prevent symptoms in carriers.

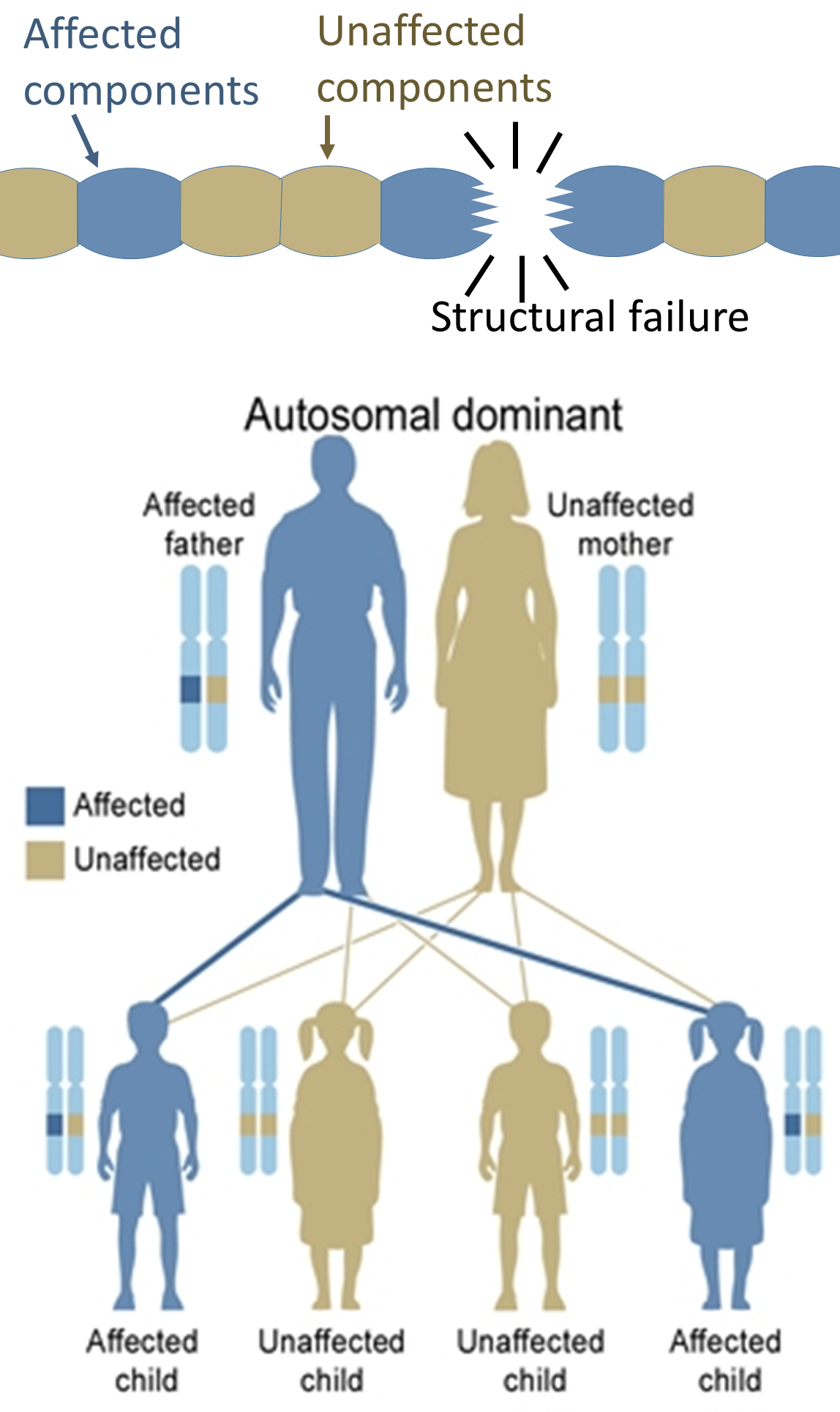
On the other hand, hereditary defects in structural proteins (such as osteogenesis imperfecta, Marfan's syndrome and many Ehlers–Danlos syndromes) are generally autosomal dominant, because it is enough that some components are defective to make the whole structure dysfunctional. This is a dominant-negative process, wherein a mutated gene product adversely affects the non-mutated gene product within the same cell.

=== X-linked dominant ===
Schematic karyogram showing an overview of the human genome. It shows annotated bands and sub-bands as used in the nomenclature of genetic disorders. It shows 22 homologous chromosomes, both the female (XX) and male (XY) versions of the sex chromosome (bottom right), as well as the mitochondrial genome (to scale at bottom left).

X-linked dominant disorders are caused by mutations in genes on the X chromosome. Only a few disorders have this inheritance pattern, with a prime example being X-linked hypophosphatemic rickets. Males and females are both affected in these disorders, with males typically being more severely affected than females. Some X-linked dominant conditions, such as Rett syndrome, incontinentia pigmenti type 2, and Aicardi syndrome, are usually fatal in males either in utero or shortly after birth, and are therefore predominantly seen in females. Exceptions to this finding are extremely rare cases in which boys with Klinefelter syndrome (44+xxy) also inherit an X-linked dominant condition and exhibit symptoms more similar to those of a female in terms of disease severity. The chance of passing on an X-linked dominant disorder differs between men and women. The sons of a man with an X-linked dominant disorder will all be unaffected (since they receive their father's Y chromosome), but his daughters will all inherit the condition. A woman with an X-linked dominant disorder has a 50% chance of having an affected foetus with each pregnancy, although in cases such as incontinentia pigmenti, only female offspring are generally viable.

=== X-linked recessive ===
X-linked recessive conditions are also caused by mutations in genes on the X chromosome. Males are much more frequently affected than females, because they only have the one X chromosome necessary for the condition to present. The chance of passing on the disorder differs between men and women. The sons of a man with an X-linked recessive disorder will not be affected (since they receive their father's Y chromosome), but his daughters will be carriers of one copy of the mutated gene. A woman who is a carrier of an X-linked recessive disorder (X^{R}X^{r}) has a 50% chance of having sons who are affected and a 50% chance of having daughters who are carriers of one copy of the mutated gene. X-linked recessive conditions include the serious diseases hemophilia A, Duchenne muscular dystrophy, and Lesch–Nyhan syndrome, as well as common and less serious conditions such as male pattern baldness and red–green color blindness. X-linked recessive conditions can sometimes manifest in females due to skewed X-inactivation or monosomy X (Turner syndrome).

=== Y-linked ===
Y-linked disorders are caused by mutations on the Y chromosome. These conditions may only be transmitted from the heterogametic sex (e.g. male humans) to offspring of the same sex. More simply, this means that Y-linked disorders in humans can only be passed from men to their sons; females can never be affected because they do not possess Y-allosomes.

Y-linked disorders are exceedingly rare but the most well-known examples typically cause infertility. Reproduction in such conditions is only possible through the circumvention of infertility by medical intervention.

=== Mitochondrial ===
This type of inheritance, also known as maternal inheritance, is the rarest and applies to the 13 genes encoded by mitochondrial DNA. Because only egg cells contribute mitochondria to the developing embryo, only mothers (who are affected) can pass on mitochondrial DNA conditions to their children. An example of this type of disorder is Leber's hereditary optic neuropathy.

It is important to stress that the vast majority of mitochondrial diseases (particularly when symptoms develop in early life) are actually caused by a nuclear gene defect, as the mitochondria are mostly developed by non-mitochondrial DNA. These diseases most often follow autosomal recessive inheritance.

== Multifactorial disorder ==
Genetic disorders may also be complex, multifactorial, or polygenic, meaning they are likely associated with the effects of multiple genes in combination with lifestyles and environmental factors. Multifactorial disorders include heart disease and diabetes. Although complex disorders often cluster in families, they do not have a clear-cut pattern of inheritance. This makes it difficult to determine a person's risk of inheriting or passing on these disorders. Complex disorders are also difficult to study and treat because the specific factors that cause most of these disorders have not yet been identified. Studies that aim to identify the cause of complex disorders can use several methodological approaches to determine genotype–phenotype associations. One method, the genotype-first approach, starts by identifying genetic variants within patients and then determining the associated clinical manifestations. This is opposed to the more traditional phenotype-first approach, and may identify causal factors that have previously been obscured by clinical heterogeneity, penetrance, and expressivity.

On a pedigree, polygenic diseases do tend to "run in families", but the inheritance does not fit simple patterns as with Mendelian diseases. This does not mean that the genes cannot eventually be located and studied. There is also a strong environmental component to many of them (e.g., blood pressure).

Other such cases include:

- asthma
- autoimmune diseases such as multiple sclerosis
- cancers
- ciliopathies
- cleft palate
- diabetes
- heart disease
- hypertension
- inflammatory bowel disease
- intellectual disability
- mood disorder
- obesity
- refractive error
- infertility

== Chromosomal disorder ==
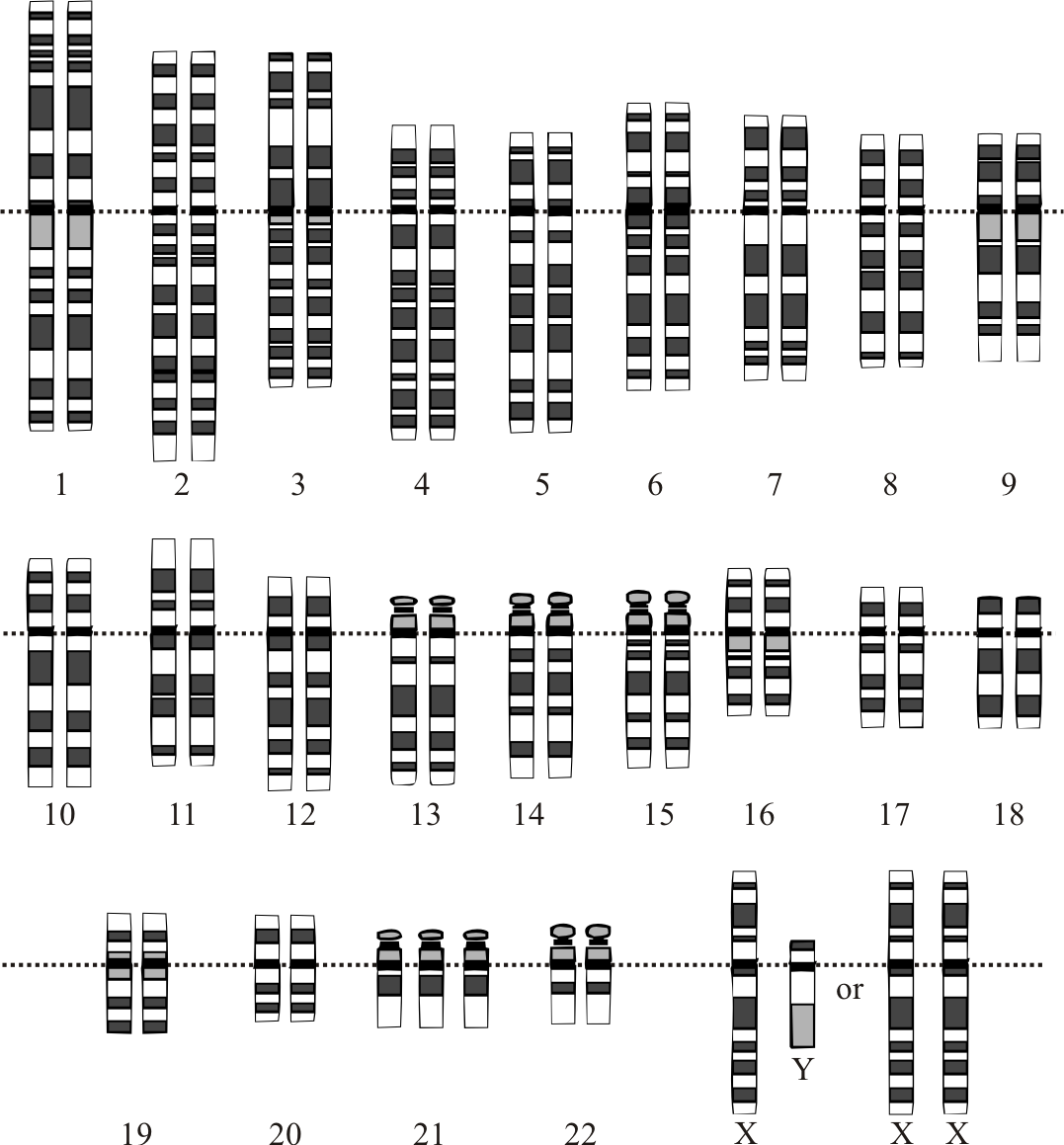
Chromosomes in Down syndrome, the most common human condition due to aneuploidy. There are three chromosomes 21 (in the last row).

A chromosomal disorder is a missing, extra, or irregular portion of chromosomal DNA. It can be from an atypical number of chromosomes or a structural abnormality in one or more chromosomes. An example of these disorders is Trisomy 21 (the most common form of Down syndrome), in which there is an extra copy of chromosome 21 in all cells.

== Diagnosis ==
Due to the wide range of genetic disorders that are known, diagnosis is widely varied and dependent of the disorder. Most genetic disorders are diagnosed pre-birth, at birth, or during early childhood. However, some, such as Huntington's disease, can escape detection until the patient begins exhibiting symptoms well into adulthood.

The basic aspects of a genetic disorder rests on the inheritance of genetic material. With an in depth family history, it is possible to anticipate possible disorders in children which direct medical professionals to specific tests depending on the disorder and allow parents the chance to prepare for potential lifestyle changes, anticipate the possibility of stillbirth, or contemplate termination. Prenatal diagnosis can detect the presence of characteristic abnormalities in fetal development through ultrasound, or detect the presence of characteristic substances via invasive procedures which involve inserting probes or needles into the uterus such as in amniocentesis.

== Prognosis ==
Not all genetic disorders directly result in death; however, there are no known cures for genetic disorders. Many genetic disorders affect stages of development, such as Down syndrome, while others result in purely physical symptoms such as muscular dystrophy. Other disorders, such as Huntington's disease, show no signs until adulthood. During the active time of a genetic disorder, patients mostly rely on maintaining or slowing the degradation of quality of life and maintain patient autonomy. This includes physical therapy and pain management.

== Treatment ==
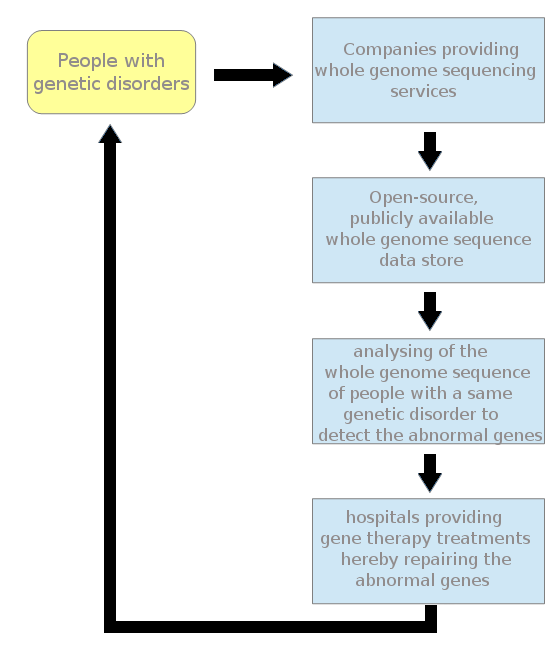
From personal genomics to gene therapy

The treatment of disorder an ongoing battle, with over 1,800 gene therapy clinical trials having been completed, are ongoing, or have been approved worldwide. Despite this, most treatment options revolve around treating the symptoms of the disorders in an attempt to improve patient quality of life.

Gene therapy refers to a form of treatment where a healthy gene is introduced to a patient. This should alleviate the defect caused by a faulty gene or slow the progression of the disease. A major obstacle has been the delivery of genes to the appropriate cell, tissue, and organ affected by the disorder. Researchers have investigated how they can introduce a gene into the potentially trillions of cells that carry the defective copy. Finding an answer to this has been a roadblock between understanding the genetic disorder and correcting the genetic disorder.

== Epidemiology ==
Most genetic disorders are individually rare (usually defined as affecting less than 1 in 2,000 people). Though there are well over 6,000 known genetic disorders, and new genetic disorders are constantly being described in medical literature.

== History ==
The earliest known genetic condition in a hominid was in the fossil species Paranthropus robustus, with over a third of individuals displaying amelogenesis imperfecta.

== See also ==
- FINDbase (the Frequency of Inherited Disorders database)
- Genetic epidemiology
- List of genetic disorders
- Population groups in biomedicine
- Mendelian error
