= OttoBib =

Web tool to generate a bibliography

OttoBib.com
- Website type: metasearch
- Owner: jonathanotto.com
- Creator: Jonathan Otto
- Website: http://www.ottobib.com/
- Registration: no
- Launched: January 2006
- Current status: no longer operational

OttoBib.com was a website with a free tool to generate an alphabetized bibliography of books from a list of International Standard Book Numbers (ISBN) with output in MLA, APA, Chicago/Turabian, BibTeX and Wikipedia {{cite book}} format. Each query also generated a "temporary" permalink (self-destructs in about one month) which could be used to recall the bibliography without reentering the ISBN data. The site was a metasearch engine, integrating data from several sources, including the U.S. Library of Congress API, the Amazon.com database of books, and ISBNdb.com. OttoBib accepted ISBNs with either 10 or 13 digits.

== Background ==
OttoBib.com was started as a hobby project in 2006 by Jonathan Otto, a then 4th year undergraduate at the University of Wisconsin–La Crosse, USA. It was originally called "That's Crazy Hot!" but the name was quickly changed to OttoBib because the original title was "not suitable for the academic environment and consequently won't take off."

The original inspiration for the site came from Seth Godin's January 3, 2006 blog post on "Stuck Systems", where he wrote:

A quick online search didn't turn up what seemed obvious to me: a free service that would allow a writer to type in all the ISBNs used in creating a paper and then generate two things:

1. a bibliography based on looking up the data online and
2. a web page that would allow the reader/teacher to see the books, their covers... etc.

== Functionality ==
OttoBib.com performed the two basic functions outlined. Marcus P. Zillman, an Internet information retrieval consultant and speaker said "this website is the start of a new paradigm of citing sources." Jason Clarke, a writer and web developer, said OttoBib is a "tool that solves a simple problem in a simple manner."

== Developments ==
In January 2007, OttoBib introduced a REST interface to allow a citation to be generated from a URL that contains the ISBN. For example, ISBN 0-19-511797-2 could be used in the URL:

http://ottobib.com/isbn/0195117972/apa.

to display

Patterson, J., (1997). Grand Expectations. Oxford Oxfordshire: Oxford University Press.

In February 2007, OttoBib introduced the ability to request citations in BibTeX and Wikipedia {{cite book}} formats.

As of April 2022, OttoBib is no longer operational.

== See also ==
- Citation creator
- Bibliographic database
- Delicious Library
- ISBNdb.com
- Reference management software
