= Calculator watch =

Type of watch with calculator functionality

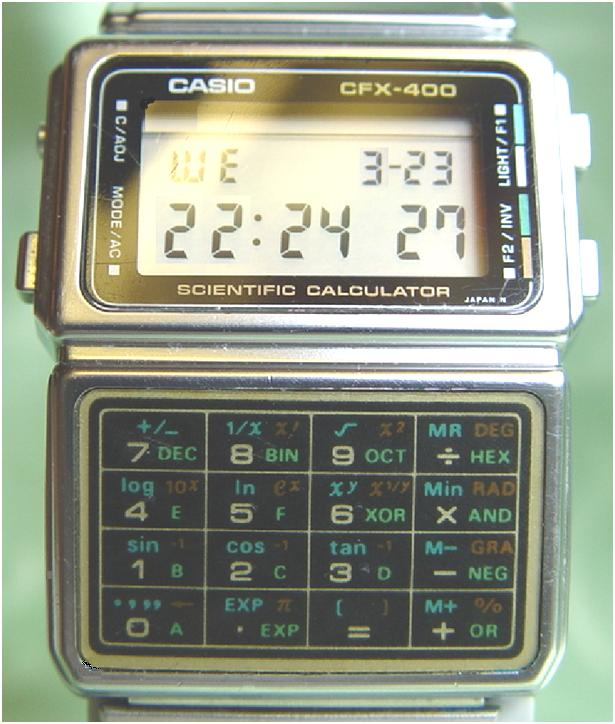
Casio CFX-400 scientific calculator watch c. 1985

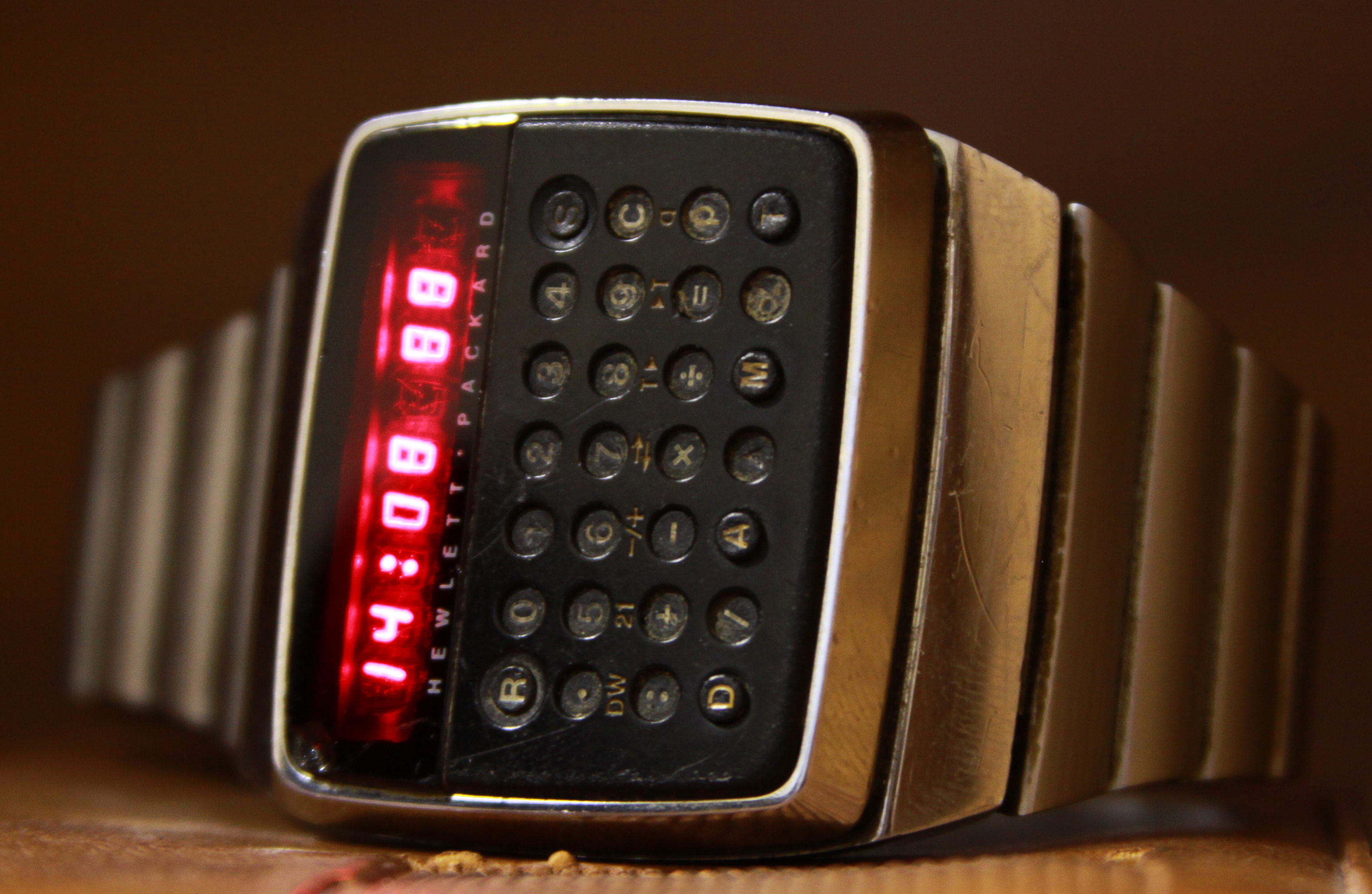
A HP-01 calculator watch

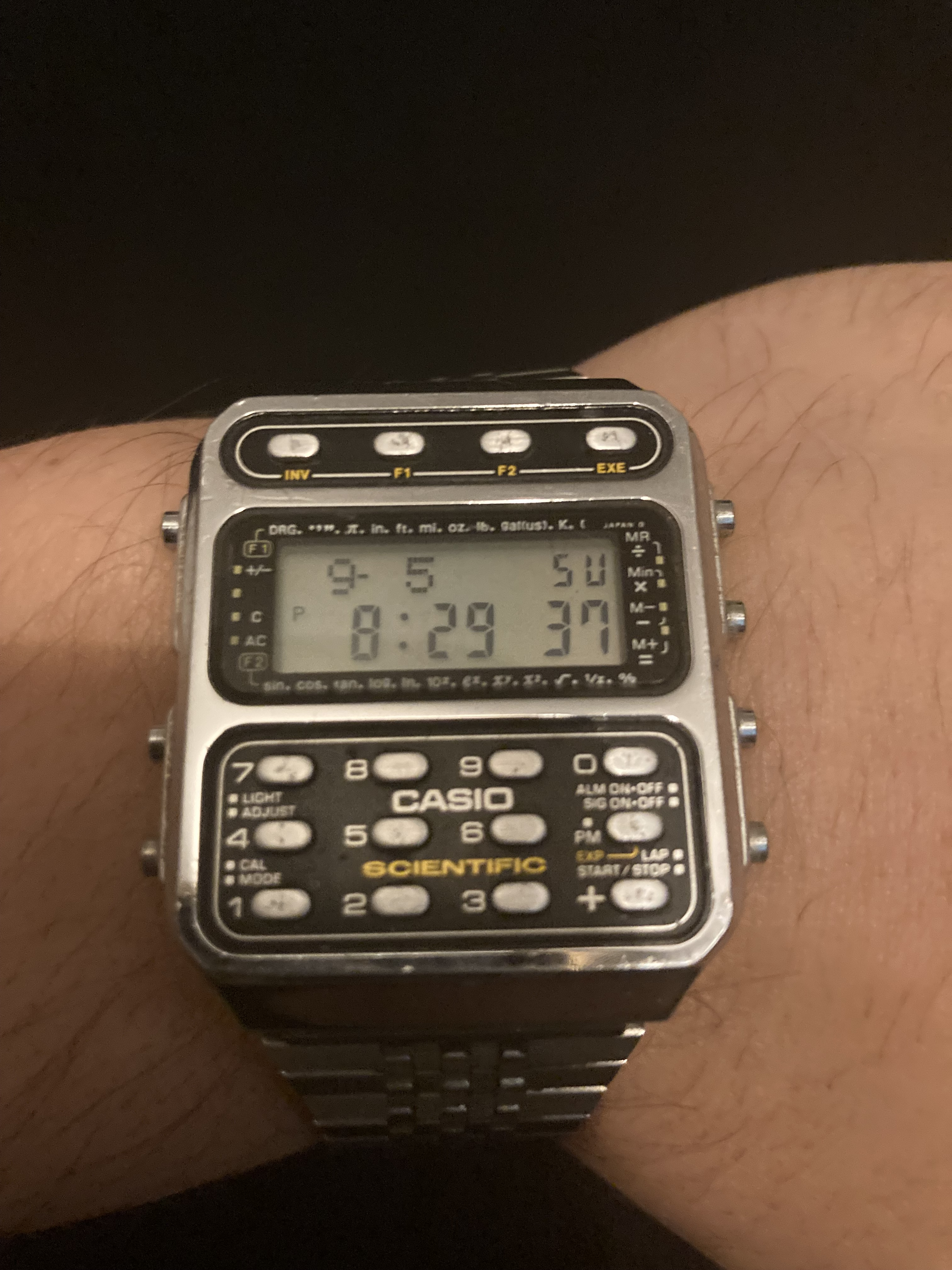
A CFX-200 scientific calculator watch; it has trigonometric functions and scientific conversion capabilities.

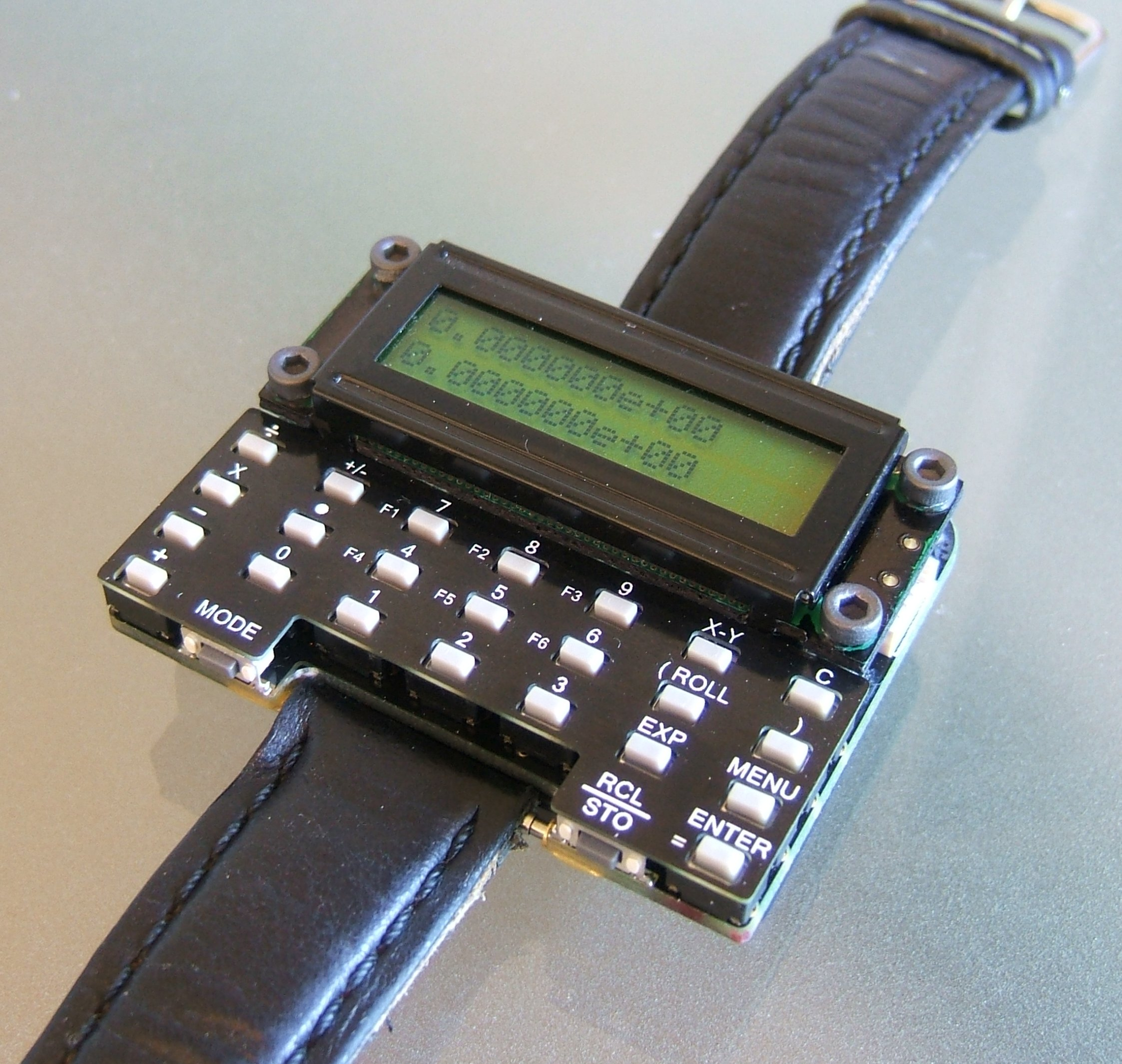
The μWatch, an open-source DIY scientific calculator watch

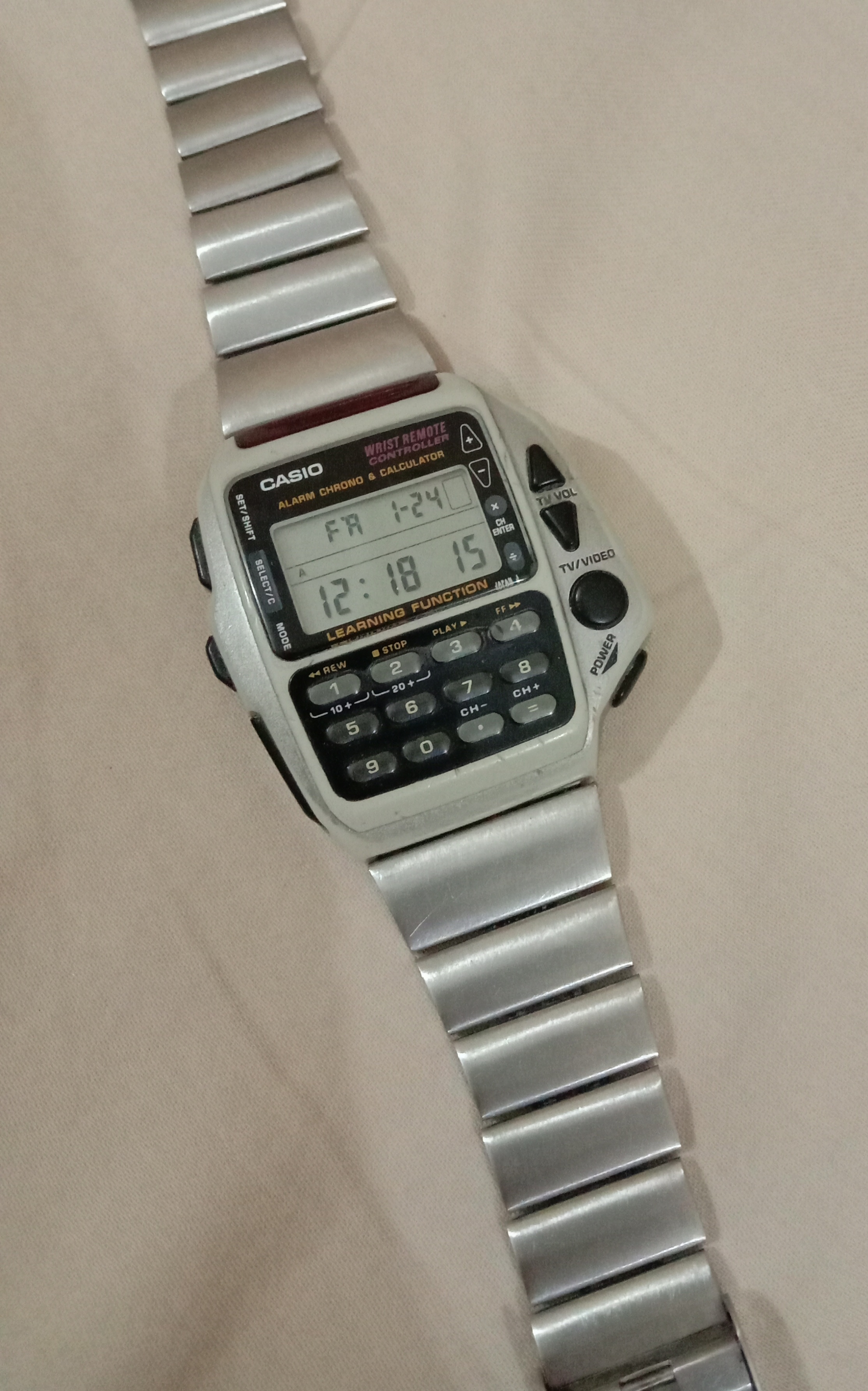
Casio CMD-40 calculator watch with built-in remote control

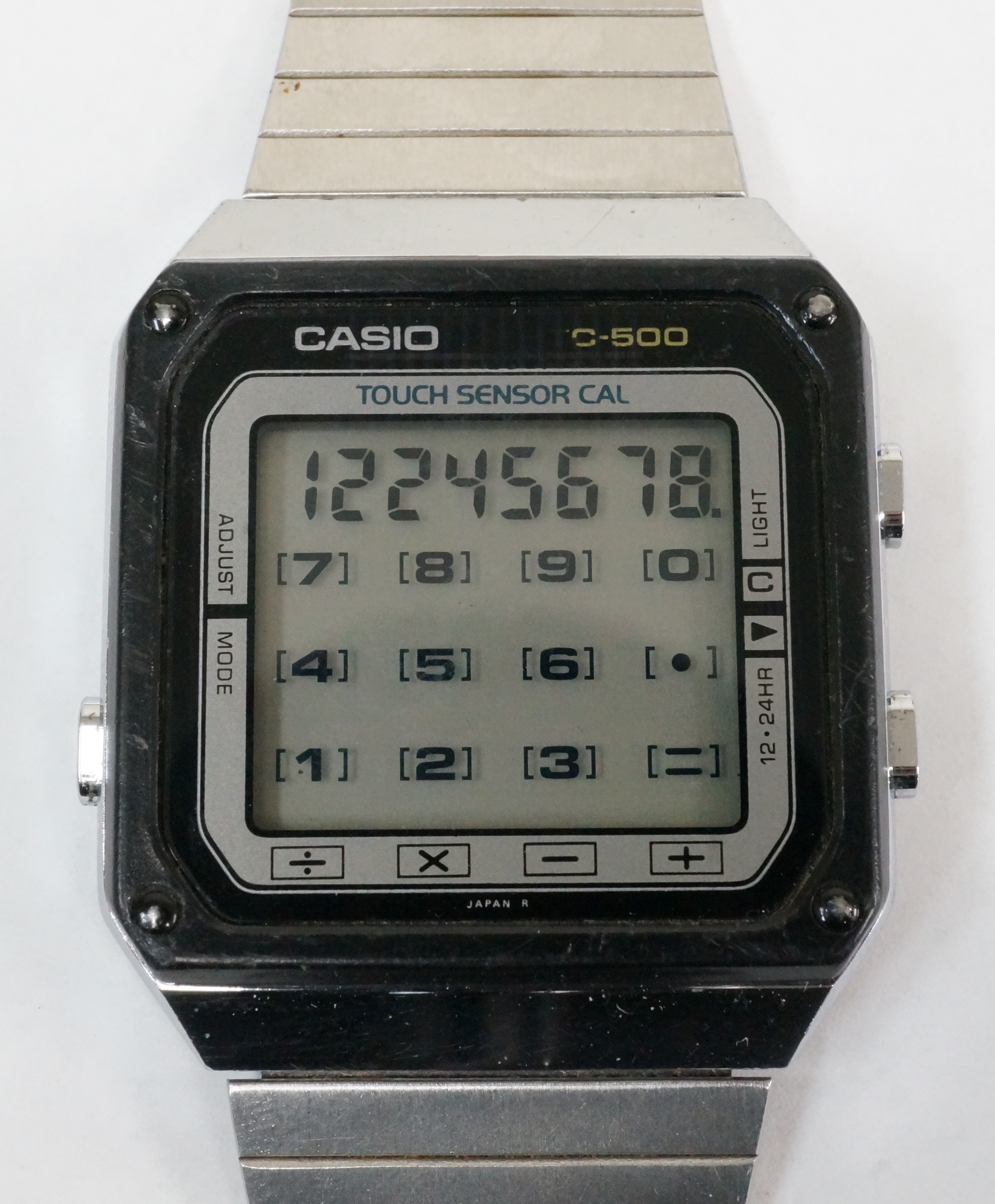
The Casio TC500 touch sensor calculator watch from 1983. It uses a capacitive touch screen for the calculator and function buttons.

A calculator watch is a digital watch with a built-in calculator, usually including buttons on the watch face. Calculator watches were first introduced in the 1970s and continue to be produced, despite falling from their peak popularity during the 1980s. The most dominant brands were the Casio Databank series and Timex. Today, calculator watches are considered vintage fashion or nostalgia items for their iconic, retro-style appearances. With technological advances in the 2010s, smartwatches greatly improved upon calculator watches by introducing mobile device and Internet capability.

Most calculator watches perform only basic arithmetic operations (addition, subtraction, multiplication, and division). However, there are several models with additional functions: scientific, including transcendent and trigonometry, in models Casio CFX-20, CFX-200, CFX-400 and Citizen 49–9421, financial functions (Casio CBA-10) and also TV remote control functions (CMD-40B and CMD-30B).

Usually, calculator watches operate with eight-digit numbers; however, calculator watches can work with six digits (for example, Casio C-801) or ten-digits (Casio CBA-10).878

== History ==
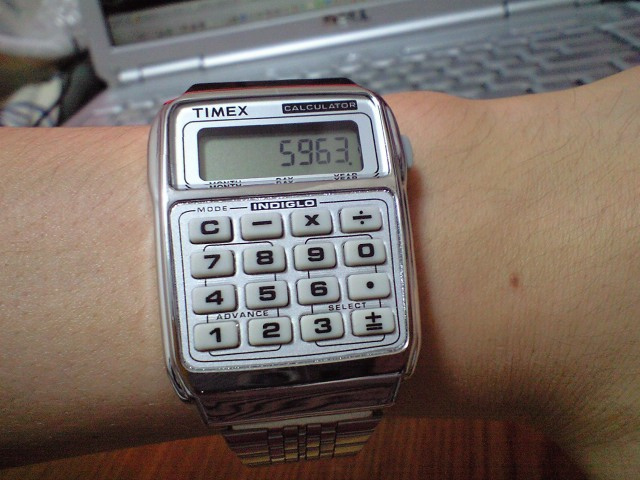
Timex CA3A0441 calculator watch

Calculator watches first appeared in the mid-1970s introduced by Pulsar (1975, then a brand of the Hamilton Watch Company) and Hewlett-Packard.

Another popular calculator watch was the Time Computer Calculator 901, which could perform basic arithmetic functions. The 902 models had additional functions such as percentage calculations. The Time watches carried a high price tag (US$4,000) because they were made of solid gold and operated by a stylus pen owing to the small size of their buttons.

Popular watches include those from Seiko and Citizen, some of which had innovative functions.

Japanese electronics company Casio produced the widest variety of calculator watches. In the mid-1980s, Casio created the Databank calculator watch, which performed calculator functions and stored appointments, names, addresses, and phone numbers. The calculator watches made by Casio earned much fame due to their appearance in movies and also due to being celebrities' choice during public events.

Mass-produced calculator watches appeared in the early 1980s, with the most being produced in the middle of the decade. Their popularity began to fade in the mid-1990s with the introduction of cheaper mobile phones and PDAs, which could perform the same functions. The calculator watch is now a collector's item, and notable watches such as the Timex watches and some special variants of Casio calculator watches such as the CFX-400 command a high premium in the used market.

== See also ==
- Casio CA-53W
- Nelsonic game watch
- Smartwatch
