= Casio Databank =

Brand of watch

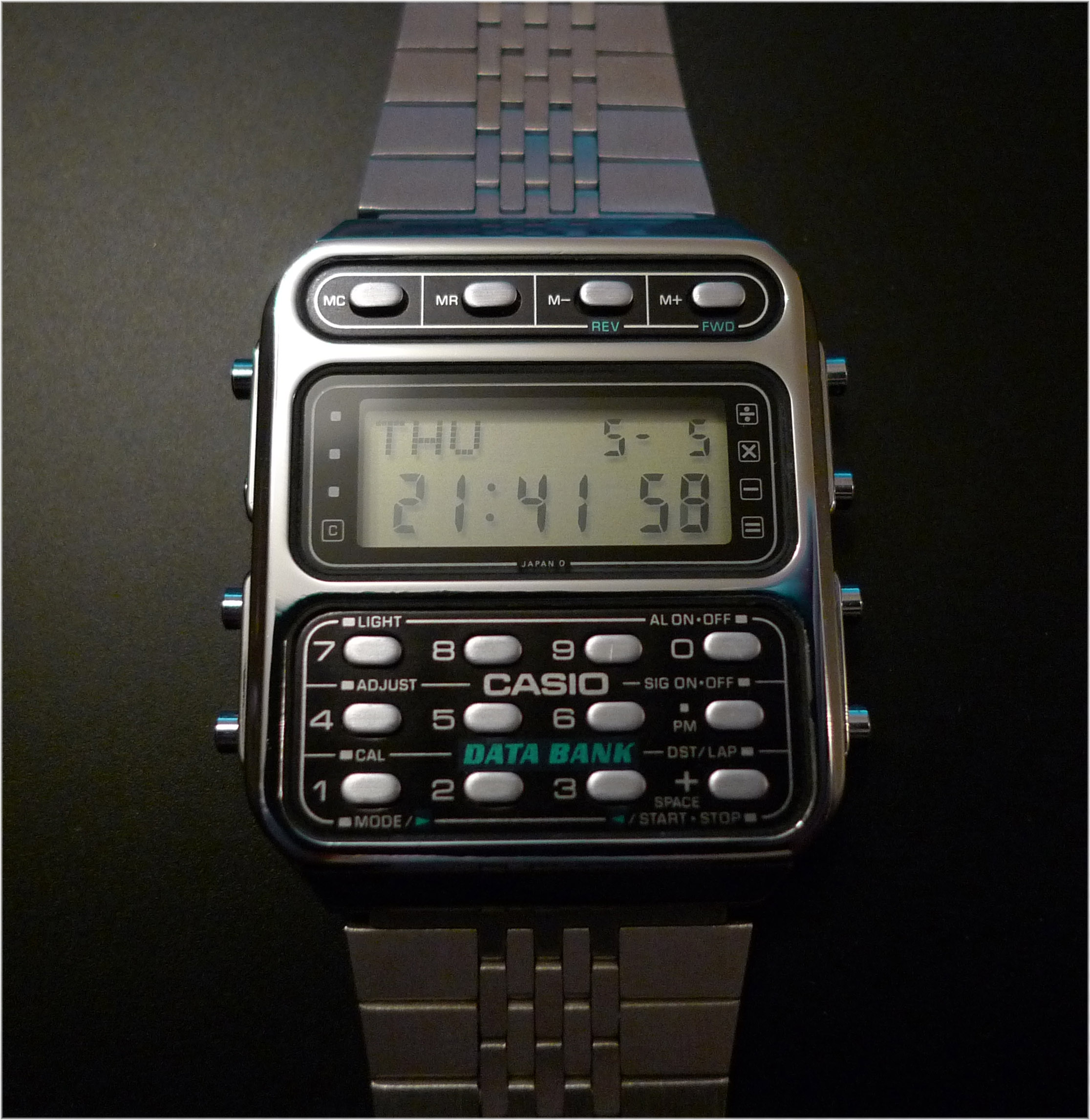
Casio CD-401, one of the first Databank watches from 1983

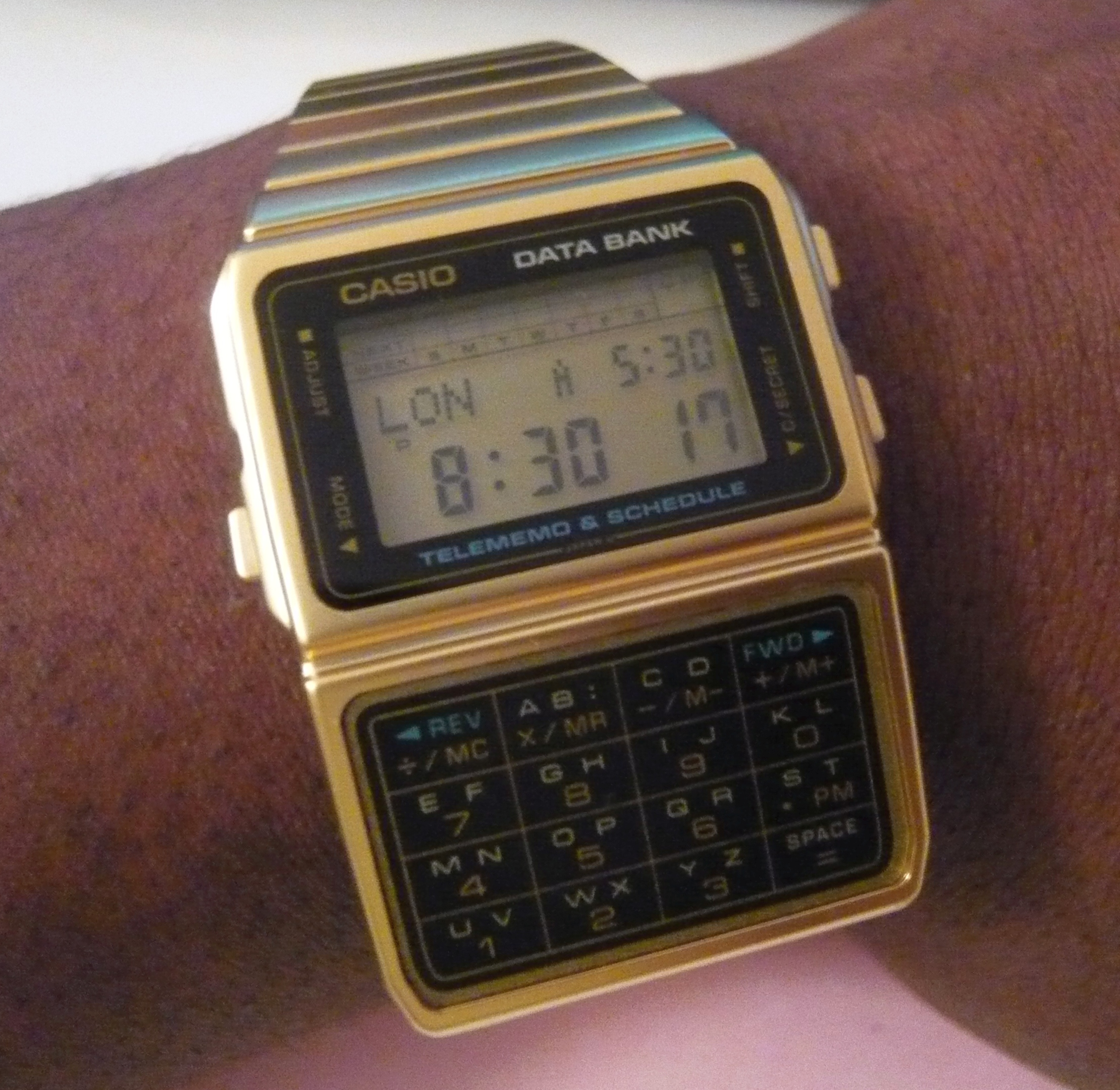
A Casio DBC-610 Databank calculator watch

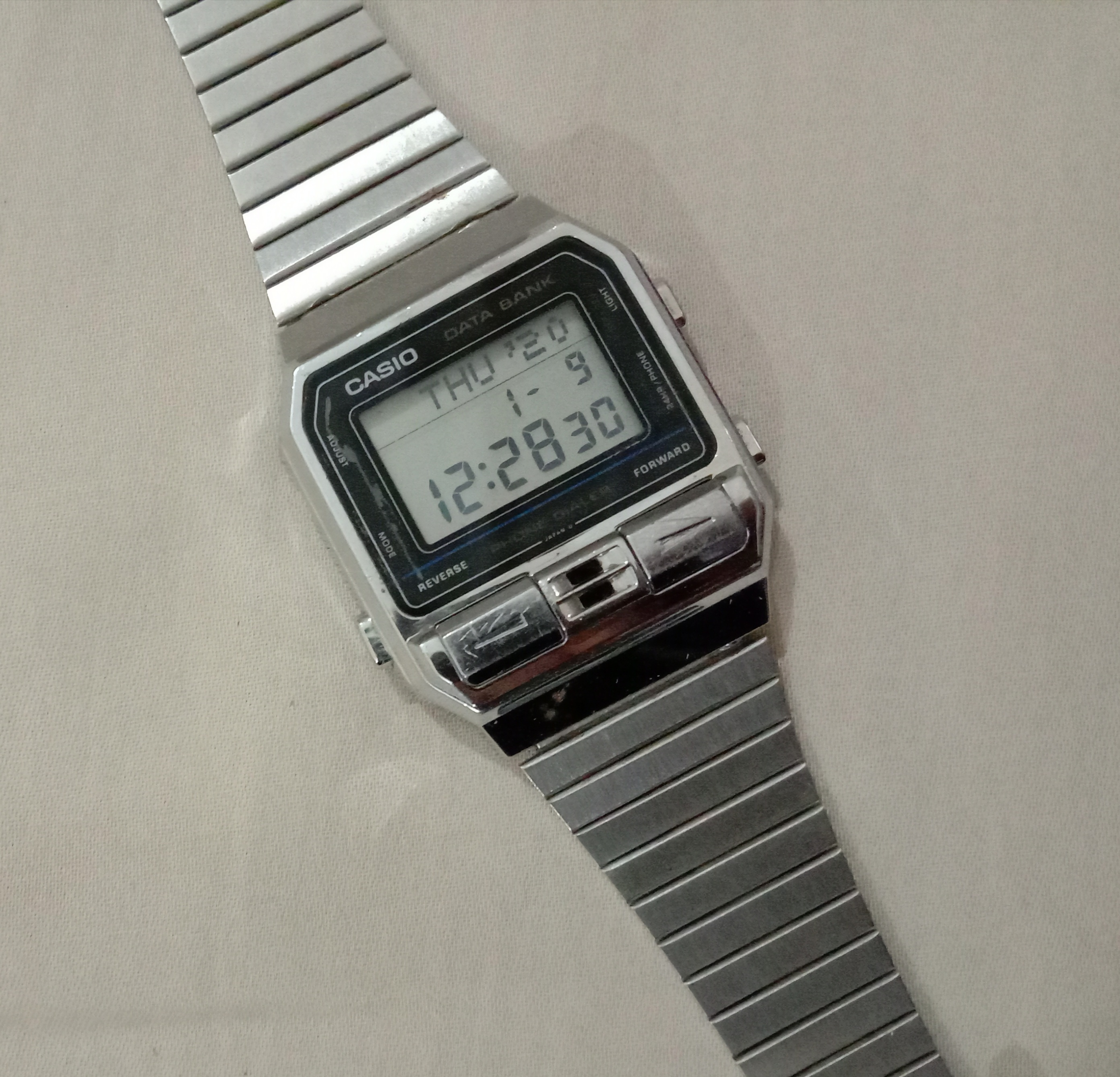
Casio DBA-800 Databank, the world's first phone dialler watch

Casio Databank (often styled as CASIO DATA BANK) is a series of digital watches and electronic personal organizers manufactured by Casio. The watches allow data storage for names and telephone numbers, memos, and in late editions, email addresses; in addition to usually providing a calculator as well as the standard features of a digital watch. The personal organizers allowed storage of names, telephones and fax numbers, memos and includes a "secret" storage area for memos which required a password to access.

== History ==
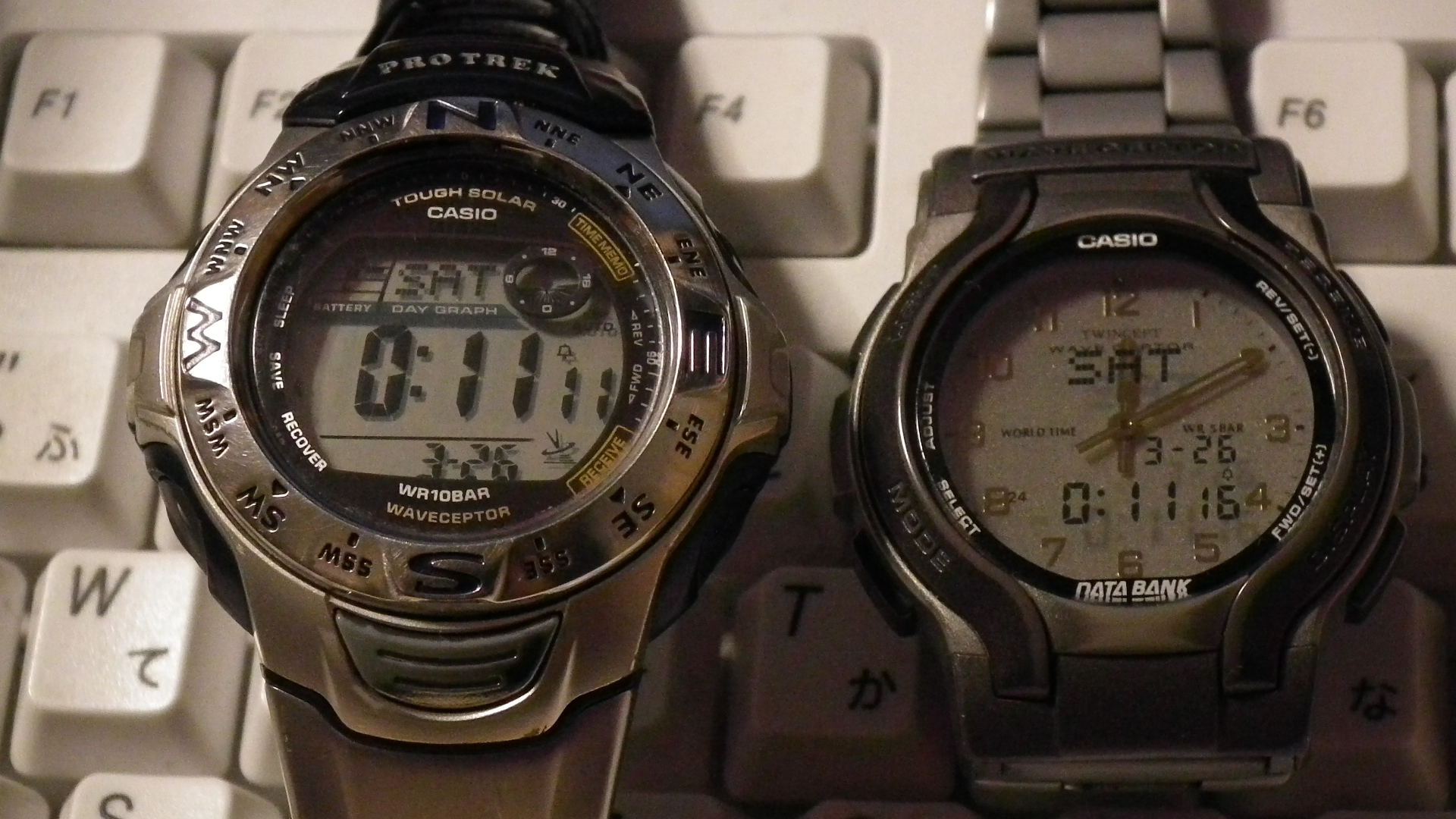
A Casio WVA-200 radio-controlled Databank (right)

Casio C-80 is the first calculator watch to be ever produced. The Databank CD-40 and CD-401 are the first Databank watches, debuting in 1983. It is one of the first digital watches developed in the 1980s that allows the user to store information, following a Pulsar model released in 1982.

Over the years, watches in the Databank line gained a variety of notable features, some of which were world firsts. These included the schedule and world time (introduced on the DBC-62), phone dialler (DBA-80/800 and DBA-100/900), an electroluminescent backlight, luminous keypads, touchscreen (VDB-1000 and VDB-200), voice recording capabilities (DBV-30/300 and DBC-V50/150) and atomic time reception functions (DBC-W150, FKT-2000 and FKT-300) in addition to data storage capabilities. Collaboration models of the Databank line were also made.

== Present ==
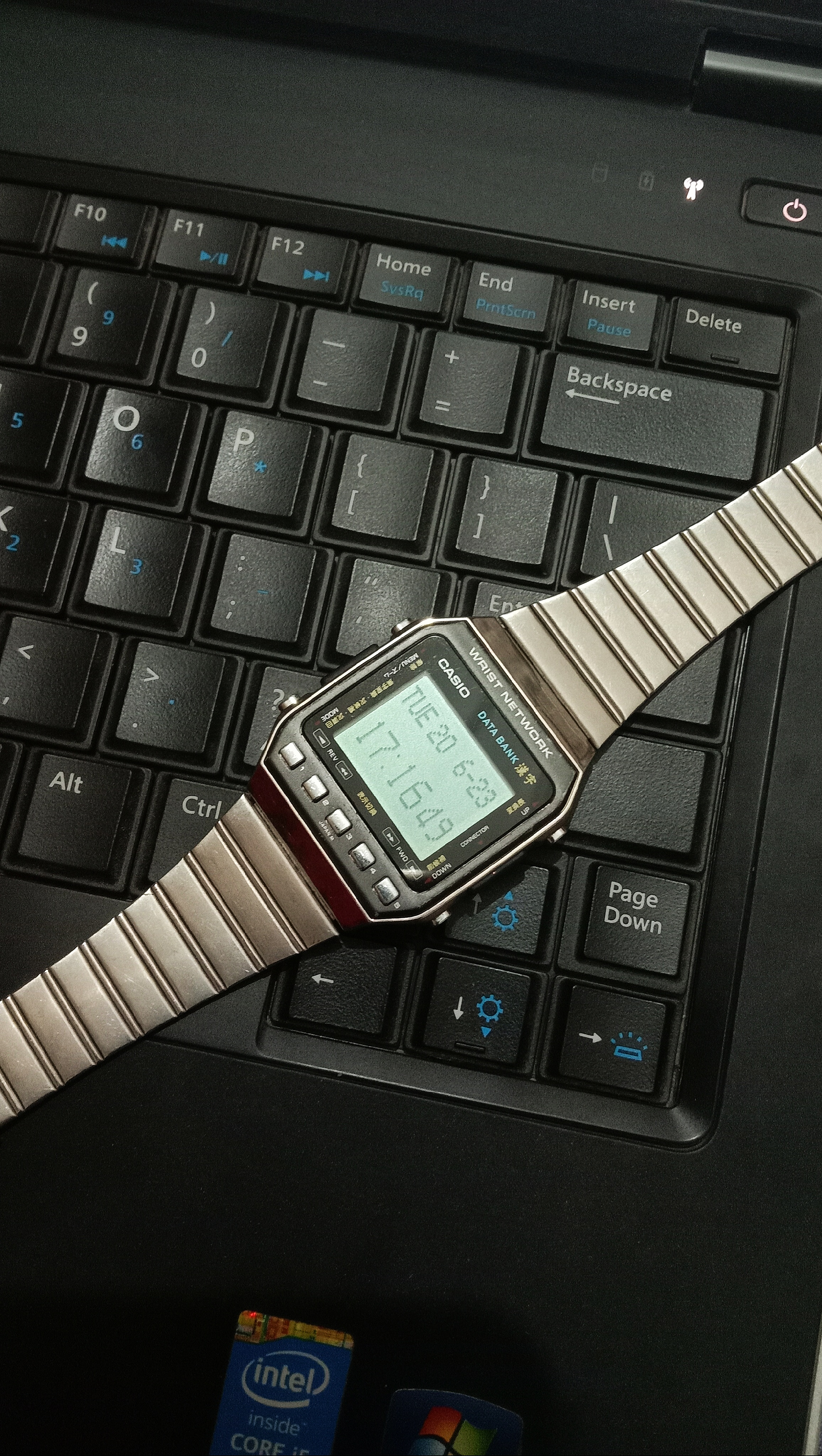
Casio DKW-100 "Kanji" Databank watch

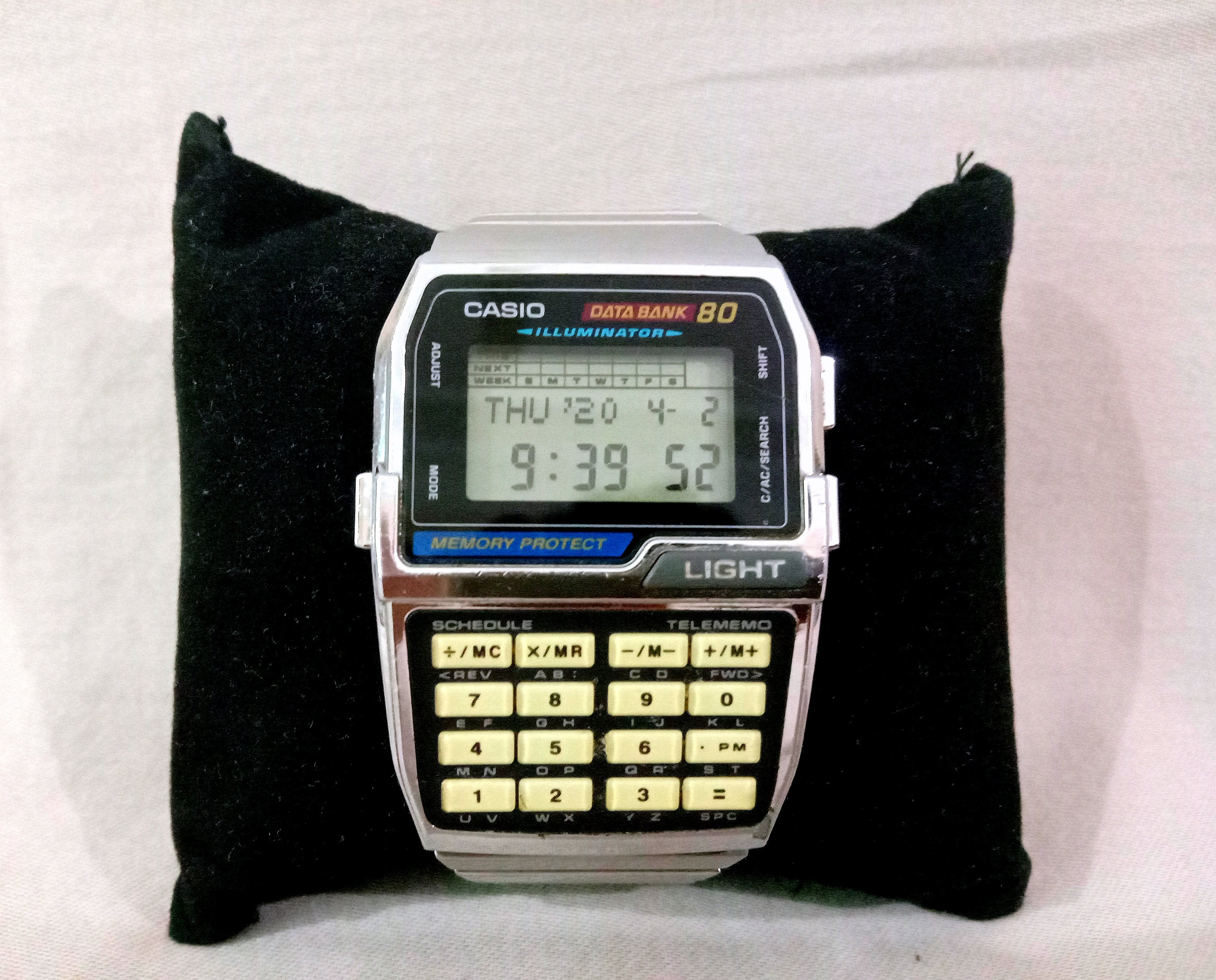
A Casio DBC-810 Databank which provides calculation and data storage capabilities

With the advent of smartphones and smartwatches, the Databank watches like calculator watches lost their popularity and are now mostly a fashion statement. Today, Casio still sells Databank models with basic data bank functions. Databank models have many unique features and are highly sought after by watch collectors.

As of 2020, Casio sells the following models of the Databank: the DBC-611 and the DBC-32, which provide data storage, calculation and schedule capabilities, the DB-380 and the DB-36/360 which provide data storage capabilities. All models allow for a selection of multiple languages.

== See also ==
- Smartwatch
- Calculator watch
