= Casio CA-53W =

Digital watch manufactured by Casio

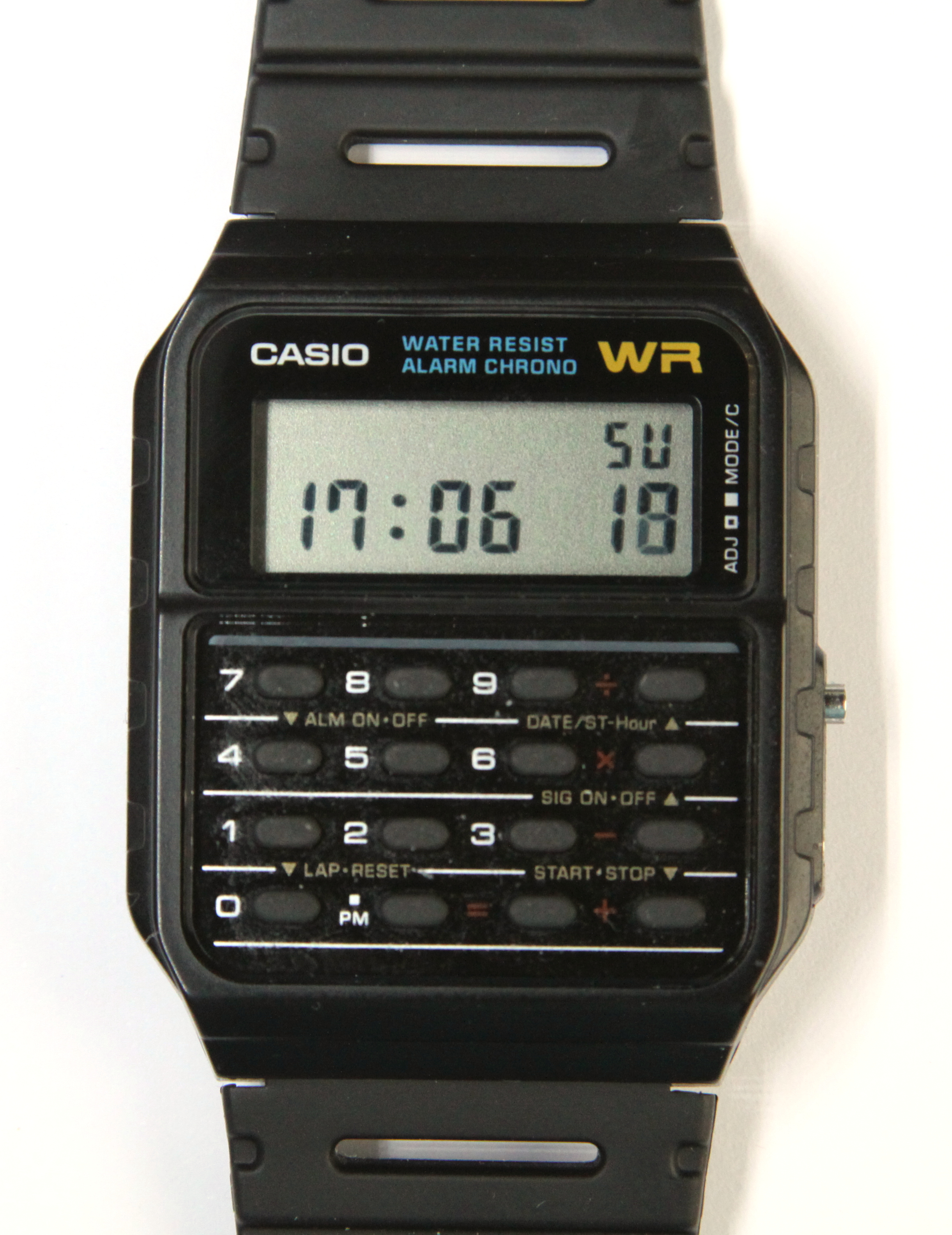
- Casio CA-53W-1 watch with resin (plastic) case and strap
- Manufacturer: Casio
- Type: Quartz
- Display: Digital
- Introduced: 1988

The Casio CA-53W is a digital calculator watch manufactured by the Japanese electronics company Casio and was introduced in 1988 as a successor to the CA-50. It became famous for its appearance in the American science fiction films Back to the Future Part II (1989) and Back to the Future Part III (1990) and later for appearing in the American TV series Breaking Bad (2008–2013).

== Specifications ==
=== Design ===
The case of the watch measures 43.2 by 34.4 by 8.2 millimetres and the watch has a weight of 24 grams. The case has a lug-to-lug width of 42 millimetres and a thickness of 8 millimeters (including the raised area of the case back). The case of the watch is made from resin, with a plastic watch crystal, and a stainless steel case back with the model and module number stamped on it which is secured with four screws. The inner lug width (where the strap attaches) is 20 millimeters, and the strap is made of polyurethane. The strap can be swapped or replaced.

=== Features ===
The CA-53W features an 8-digit calculator with basic operators, a 24-hour 1/100 second stopwatch which can measure up to 23:59.99. The stop watch can also record split times and 1st and 2nd place times. Other features include a daily alarm, a full auto calendar up to the year 2099, an hourly signal and a dual time mode. The watch is claimed to be accurate to ±15 seconds per month and is powered by a CR2016 3-volt lithium button cell. The watch has basic water-resistance which for Casio Digital watches means splash-proof (washing hands or rain). The display of the watch lacks internal illumination.

== Operation ==
The watch is operated using a built-in keypad and two pushers mounted on the side. It features a 4x4 calculator-style keypad with rubber keys, including number keys from 0 to 9, a decimal point, and arithmetic operator keys. The keypad is also marked with secondary functions and is used to control other features of the watch, such as the stopwatch, alarm, and switching between AM and PM when setting the time. On the right side of the watch are two small stainless steel pushers: one recessed pusher is used to adjust settings, while the other is used to switch between the different modes of the watch. To set the time, the user presses the adjust pusher once and enters the hours, minutes, and seconds using the keypad. The seconds can only be reset by pressing the “0” key; if this is done before 30 seconds have passed, the time resets to the start of the current minute, while doing so after 30 seconds advances the minute by one. After the time is set, the watch automatically enters the date-setting mode, which can be canceled by pressing the adjust pusher. The date is set in the same manner as the time, by entering the values through the keypad. The button operation tones can be turned on or off by pressing the adjust pusher while the watch is in calculator mode.

The display of the watch shows hours, minutes, seconds, and the day of the week. The date can be viewed by pressing the division (÷) key on the keypad while in the main time mode. The date is shown in YY/MM/DD format. An “AM” sign on the display indicates morning hours, and a “PM” sign indicates afternoon hours. The “AM” and “PM” indicators disappear when the watch is in 24-hour timekeeping mode, which is activated by pressing the addition (+) key in the time-setting mode. The alarm is indicated by vertical bars on the top left of the screen, while the hourly signal is shown by a bell icon next to the alarm icon. The display also shows the operators selected by the user in calculator mode when performing calculations.

In the stopwatch screen, the minutes, seconds and one-hundredths of a second are shown. The watch displays the elapsed hours when the key marked with the secondary function "ST-hour" on the keypad is pressed while in the stopwatch mode. Another feature of the stopwatch is the interval beep in which the watch beeps after every ten minutes have elapsed in the stopwatch mode. However, this feature works in the stopwatch mode only.

In the timekeeping mode, holding down the adjustment button and simultaneously pressing the mode button twice will enter the LCD test mode. All of the LCD cells will be filled. Pressing the mode button again will fill only some of the cells, and pressing the mode button one more time will display the module number.

LCD test mode screens

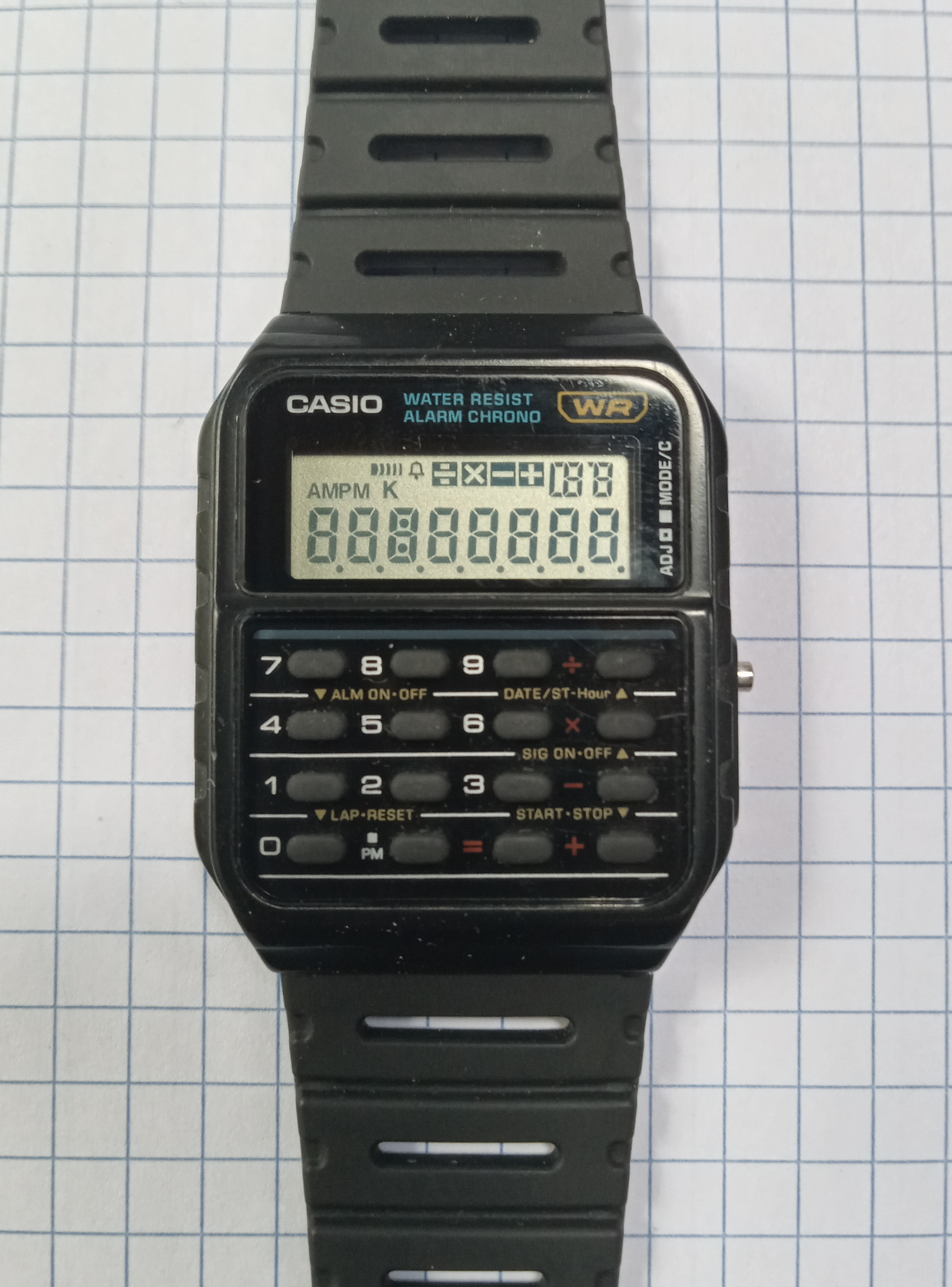
The first of the three test screens; all of the cells are filled.

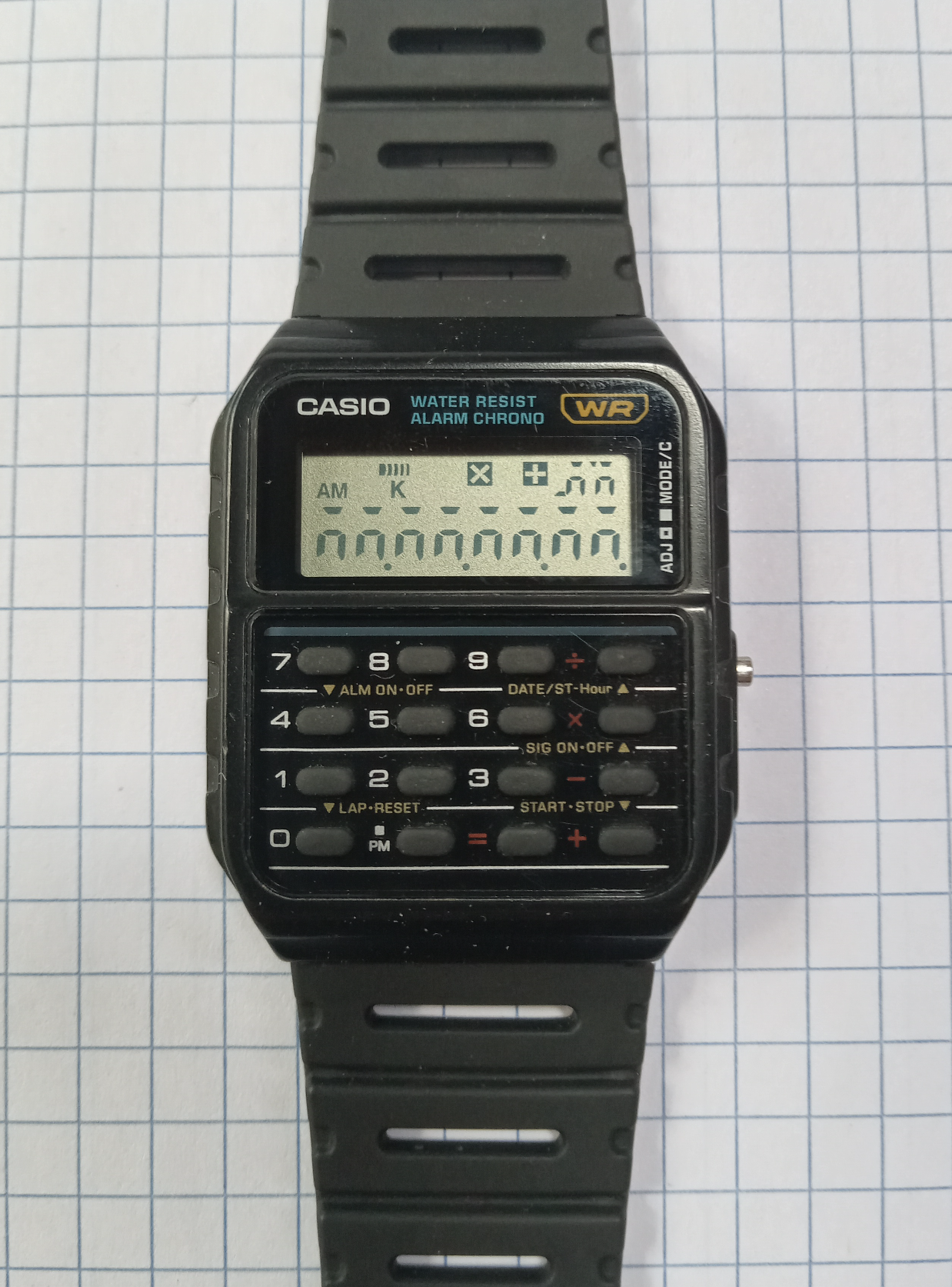
The second of the three test screens; only some of the cells are filled.

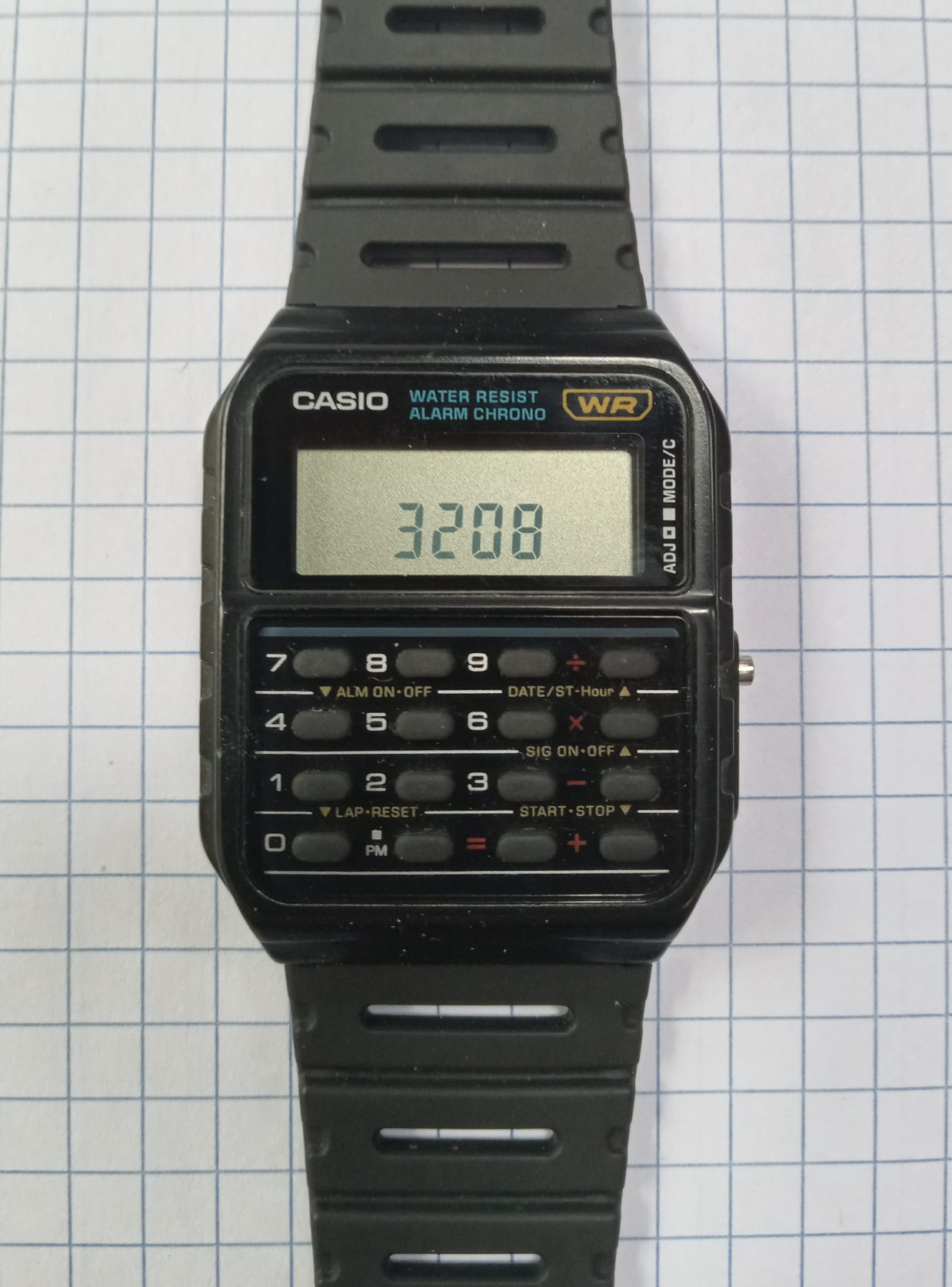
The final test screen, displaying the module number 3208

== Variants ==
Since its introduction, the CA-53W was only available in a single variation, CA-53W-1, with a black case and strap sporting a digital display consisting of dark characters against a light background. This version has changed only slightly over time.

In early 2020, Casio introduced five new variants with the model name CA-53WF, each sporting a different color case and strap. These all feature an inverted LCD, showing light characters on a dark background.

== In popular culture ==
A common misconception about the CA-53W is that the watch was worn by Marty McFly in Back to the Future (portrayed by Michael J. Fox), who in reality wore the Casio CA-50. He actually wore the CA-53W in the two sequels Back to the Future Part II and Back to the Future Part III.

The watch was also seen throughout the American TV series Breaking Bad, in which it is worn by the main protagonist, Walter White (portrayed by Bryan Cranston).
