= BiblioPage.com =

BiblioPage.com was an Amazon.com affiliate site with a database of books gathered from libraries across the world using the NISO z39.50 protocol for accessing bibliographic databases. The website used the YAZ toolkit from IndexData to access and manipulate bibliographic information.

The website was used by libraries to choose the best selection of books. By suggesting titles that libraries have purchased, the consumer was choosing only among the most relevant titles.

Similar programs that make use of public z39.50 resources are Emc2Library.com or ISBNdb.com.
