= HP-01 =

Calculator watch from 1977

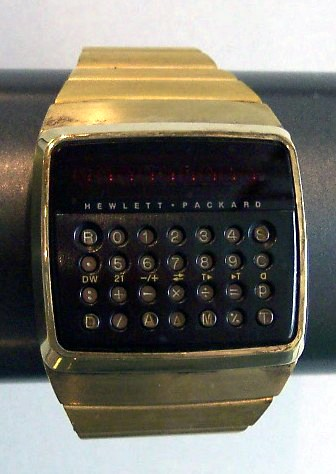
- Hewlett Packard Digital Watch Model 1
- Type: Quartz
- Display: Digital
- Introduced: 1977

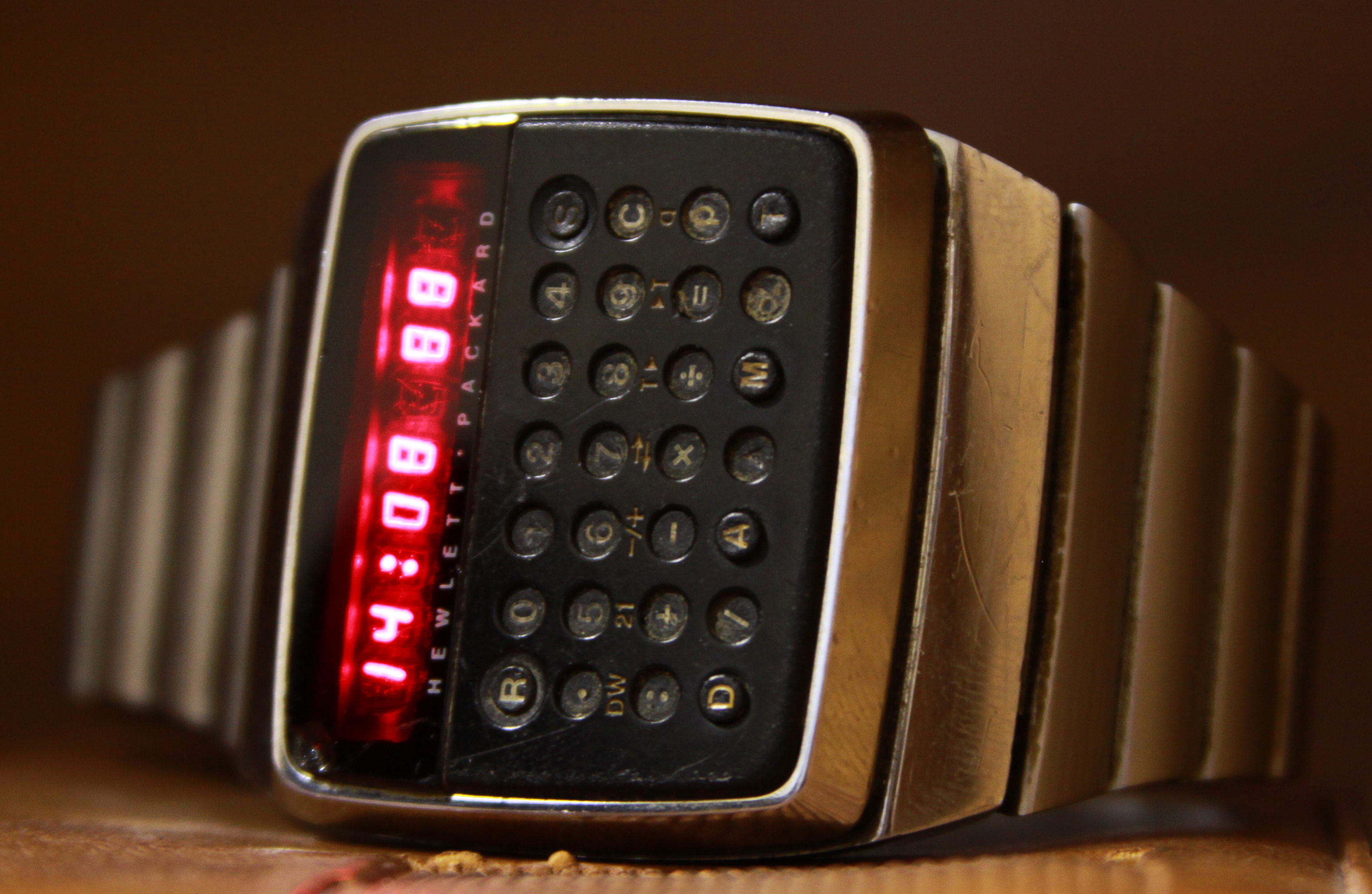
Hewlett-Packard HP-01 watch displaying the time

The Hewlett-Packard HP-01 is a calculator watch. It was designed and manufactured by Hewlett-Packard (HP). The HP-01 used 7 light-emitting diodes (LEDs)/digit in a 7 digit + decimal point arrangement for its digital display. Introduced in 1977 at the height of the LED watch craze, five models were available, two gold filled models and three stainless models. Prices were from $450 to $550 for the low end steel or gold to $850 (equivalent to $4,411 in 2024). HP also sold a battery replacement kit that allowed the customers to change the batteries themselves. The watch uses two batteries for the display and one for the processor IC. It also comes with a ball-point pen with a stylus on the rear end. Most of the 28 buttons on the HP-01 are recessed, and are designed to be depressed with a stylus that is stored in the band. The production was stopped by the end of 1979.

The HP-01 is unique not only as the only Hewlett-Packard watch but due to these unique features:

- Datatype for time, date, and time interval, and the ability to perform mathematics on these datatypes.
- A stopwatch that allows the stopwatch time to be multiplied or divided by a constant, and continuously display the results. This is referred to as a "Dynamic Rate Calculation." It can also display the day of the week for any date from 1900 to 2099.
- The HP-01 is Hewlett-Packard's first algebraic calculator. Prior to the HP-01, all HP calculators used Reverse Polish Notation (RPN). Some later HP calculators use a mixture of both.
