= ClassRanked =

American educational technology company

ClassRanked Inc
- Type: Private
- Industry: Education technology
- Founded: 2018; 8 years ago
- Area served: Global
- Products: Course evaluation Survey management
- Website: classranked.com

ClassRanked is an American educational technology company that offers higher education enterprise software for course evaluations and assessment. The platform was founded at Duke University.

On April 20, 2026 ClassRanked was acquired by JMI Equity and Coursedog.

== History ==
ClassRanked was founded at Duke University by Hayden Hall, Max Labaton, and Dilan Trivedi in their junior year. While registering for classes, they spent hours searching to fulfill academic requirements and built a platform to streamline and automate this process. It combined course evaluations, grade distribution data, and user reviews.

ClassRanked was initially launched at Duke University. By the end of its first week, ClassRanked had over 1,200 user reviews and within a month was being actively used by over 80% of Duke’s student body.

In August 2019, ClassRanked announced its expansion to University of Pennsylvania, UC Berkeley, UNC-Chapel Hill, and Emory University. As of October 2020, the company had expanded to over 350 colleges and universities.

On April 20, 2026 ClassRanked was acquired by the private equity firm JMI Equity and Coursedog.
