= ProBiS =

- Developer(s): Insilab (National Institute of Chemistry Slovenia)
- Initial release: 2010; 15 years ago
- Written in: C++, JavaScript, PHP
- Operating system: Unix-like, Windows
- Type: Web server, plugin, algorithm, database
- Website: probis.cmm.ki.si

ProBiS is a computer software which allows prediction of binding sites and their corresponding ligands for a given protein structure. Initially ProBiS was developed as a ProBiS algorithm by Janez Konc and Dušanka Janežič in 2010 and is now available as ProBiS server, ProBiS CHARMMing server, ProBiS algorithm and ProBiS plugin. The name ProBiS originates from the purpose of the software itself, that is to predict for a given Protein structure Binding Sites and their corresponding ligands.

== Description ==
ProBiS software started as ProBiS algorithm that detects structurally similar sites on protein surfaces by local surface structure alignment using a fast maximum clique algorithm. The ProBiS algorithm was followed by ProBiS server which provides access to the program ProBiS that detects protein binding sites based on local structural alignments. There are two ProBiS servers available, ProBiS server and ProBiS CHARMMing server. The latter connects ProBiS and CHARMMing servers into one functional unit that enables prediction of protein−ligand complexes and allows for their geometry optimization and interaction energy calculation. The ProBiS CHARMMing server with these additional functions can only be used at National Institutes of Health, USA. Otherwise it acts as a regular ProBiS server. Additionally a ProBiS PyMOL plugin and ProBiS UCSF Chimera plugin have been made. Both plugins are connected via the internet to a newly prepared database of pre-calculated binding site comparisons to allow fast prediction of binding sites in existing proteins from the Protein Data Bank. They enable viewing of predicted binding sites and ligands poses in three-dimensional graphics.

== Protein building sites tools ==
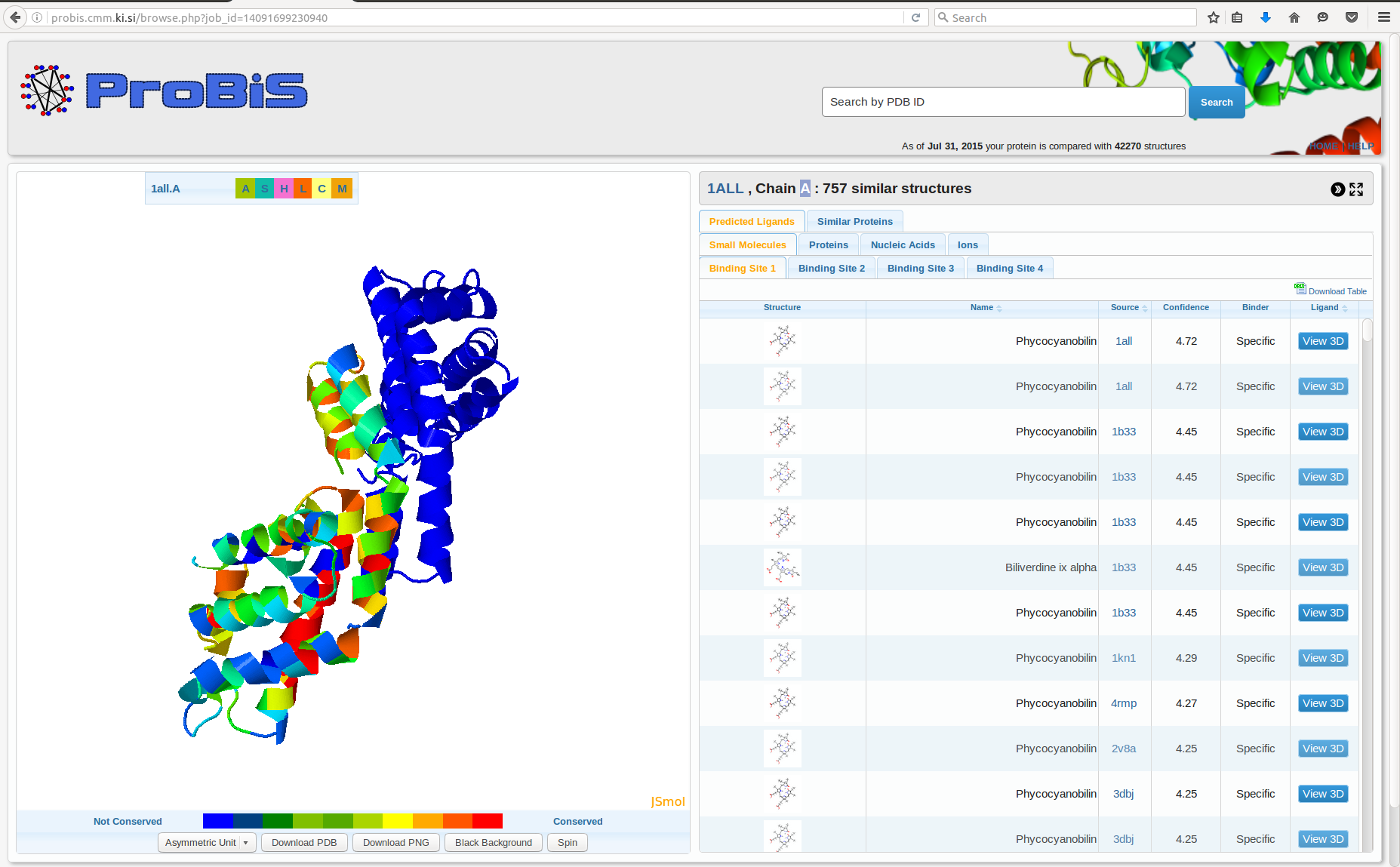
An example output of the ProBiS software for detecting structurally similar binding sites.

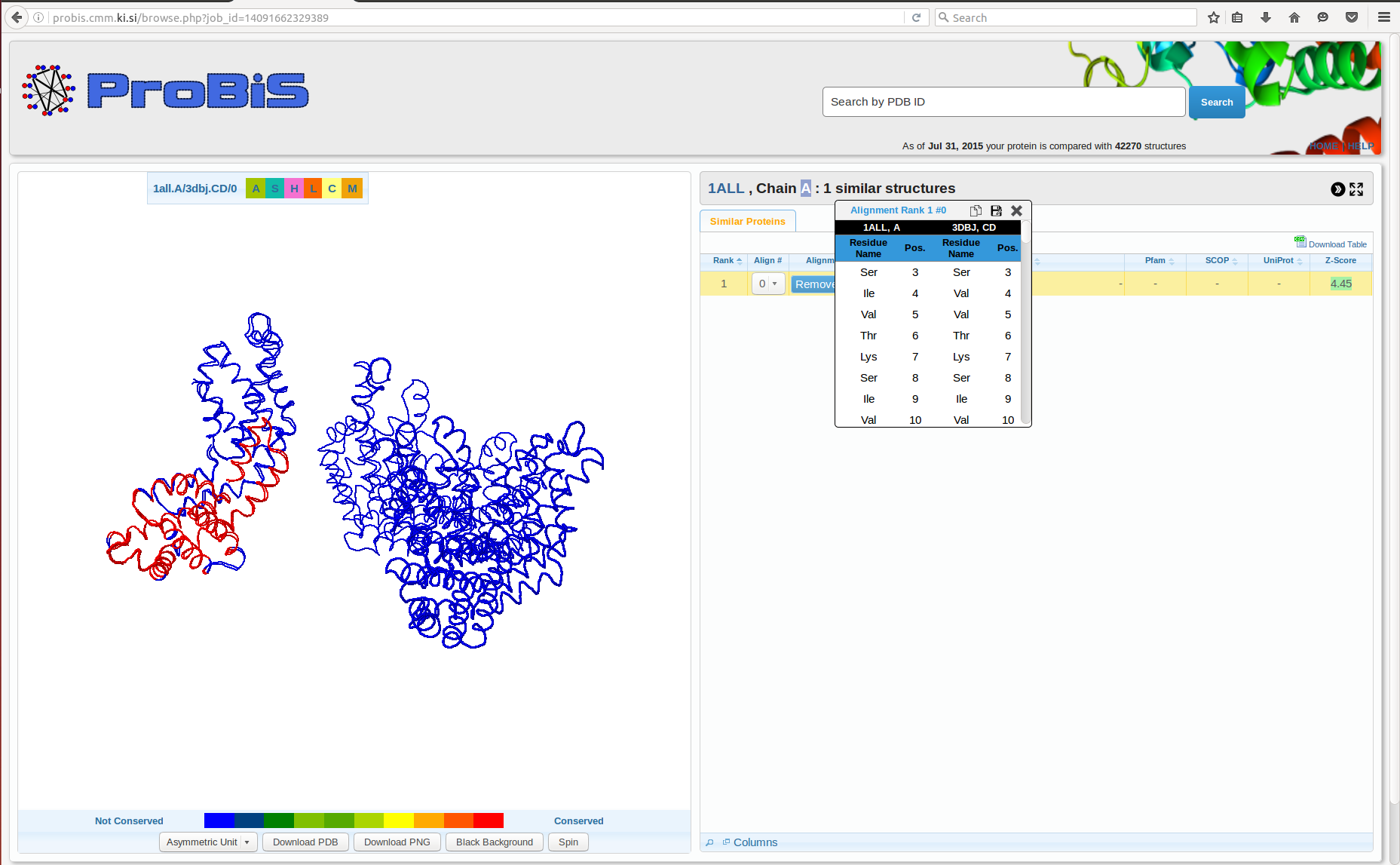
An example output of the ProBiS software for pairwise alignment of two proteins.

Detect structurally similar binding sites
This tool takes as an input a query protein or a binding site. The ProBiS algorithm structurally compares the query independently of sequence or fold with a database of non-redundant protein structures. The output of this tool are a 3D query protein colored by degrees of structural conservation from blue (unconserved) to red (structurally conserved) in Jmol viewer and a table of similar proteins.
Pairwise local structural alignment
This tool takes as an input two proteins or binding sites. The ProBiS algorithm compares structures based on geometry as well as physicochemical properties and returns their local structural alignment.
ProBiS web server RESTful Web Services
The ProBiS web server features RESTful (Representational State Transfer) web services to make the binding site similarities and local pairwise alignments for any PDB protein structure easily accessible from any script.
ProBiS-Database access
ProBiS-Database can be accessed directly from ProBiS (CHARMMing) server, ProBiS-Database widget, which can be included in any web page to provide access to the ProBiS-Database, or RESTful Web Services, which make ProBiS-Database easily accessible from any script.

== History ==
- ProBiS algorithm for detection of structurally similar protein binding sites by local structural alignment (March 2010)
- ProBiS: A web server for detection of structurally similar protein binding sites (February 2010)
- ProBiS-Database: Precalculated Binding Site Similarities and Local Pairwise Alignments of Pdb Structures (December 2011)
- ProBiS - 2012: Web server and web services for detection of structurally similar binding sites in proteins (February 2012)
- Parallel-ProBiS: Fast Parallel Algorithm for Local Structural Comparison of Protein Structures and Binding Sites (March 2012)
- ProBiS-ligands: a web server for prediction of ligands by examination of protein binding sites (February 2014)
- ProBiS-Charmming: Web Interface for Prediction and Optimization of Ligands in Protein Binding Sites (August 2015)
