= IndexMaster =

- Website type: Database
- Owner: IndexMaster Inc.
- Website: www.indexmaster.com
- Commercial: Yes
- Launched: 1998
- Current status: Inactive

IndexMaster.com was a legal research database that allowed users find legal treatises and monographs. The search results allowed the researcher to view the tables of contents and indexes online.

== History ==
Owned by IndexMaster Inc., IndexMaster.com was launched in 1998, it received the Best New Product of the Year in 2000 from the American Association of Law Libraries.
