= Truthfinder =

American data broker

TruthFinder
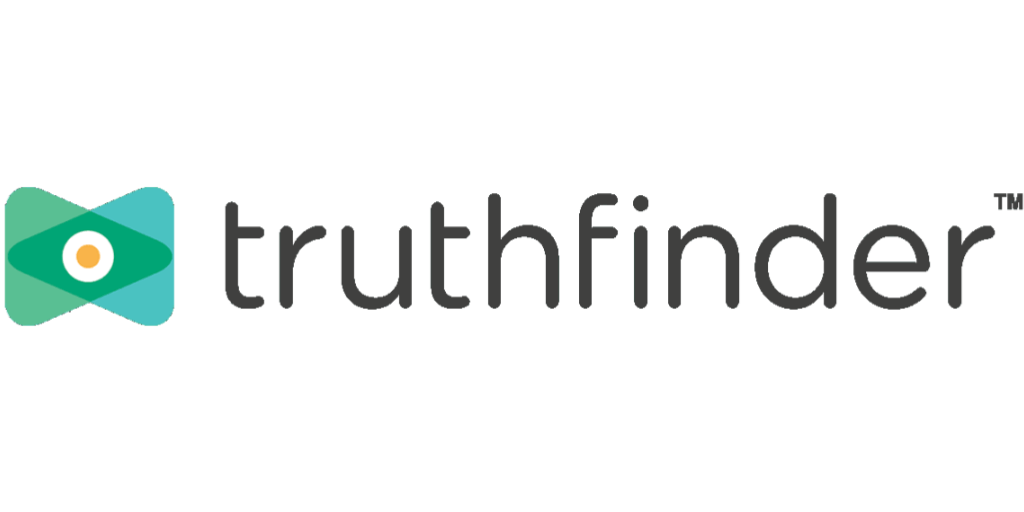
- Company type: Website
- Industry: Data broker
- Founded: March 2015; 11 years ago
- Founder: Kris Kibak; Joey Rocco
- Headquarters: San Diego, California, US
- Area served: US
- Products: subscription-based background check service
- Owner: PeopleConnect Holdings Inc.

TruthFinder is an American personal information search website based in San Diego, California. TruthFinder is owned and operated by PeopleConnect Holdings Inc., an affiliate of H.I.G. Capital, founded by Lebanese businessmen and billionaires, Samer Mnaymneh and Tony Tamer.

== History ==
TruthFinder was created in March 2015 as a new brand under PubRec, also owners of InstantCheckmate, which was founded in 2010 in San Diego, California by Kris Kibak and Joey Rocco. PubRec merged with PeopleConnect Holdings, Inc in 2020 and is now managed by H.I.G. Capital.

In December 2021, TechRadar reviewed TruthFinder.

TruthFinder provides information related to people for background checks and reverse address lookup. The website also provides an option to opt-out.
