= Zabasearch.com =

Zabasearch.com is a website that searches for and collates disparate information regarding United States residents, including names, current and past addresses, phone numbers, and birth years, and then permits the user to query other search engines with this information to retrieve additional data, such as satellite photos of addresses and criminal background checks.

== History ==
ZabaSearch was founded by Nick Matzorkis and Robert Zakari in February 2005. The site claimed to have overtaken Yahoo! People Search as the highest-trafficked people search engine in May 2005. Zabasearch was acquired by Intelius in December 2008.

== Reception ==
The information available on Zabasearch in the company's early days was available in the public domain, and it provided users with a way to find out what that information might be. Explained ZabaSearch CEO, Nick Matzorkis, "ZabaSearch provides people at least some sense of what information is available out there about them." However, critics quickly expressed privacy concerns. As an NPR story from May 2005 reported, "A search for personal data on ZabaSearch.com tends to generate one of two reactions: curiosity or panic."

Irene Davids' review at KillerStartups.com hinted at the site's usefulness for stalking but skewed towards favorable, while Reviewopedia's balanced review of Zabasearch, metatitled "Zabasearch - Legit or Scam?", even-handedly enumerates the site's pros and cons. As of April 5, 2014, the two articles posted in the "Related Articles" section, positioned immediately below the Zabasearch review, are both cautionary, "People Search Websites and What You Should Know", and "Protect Yourself from Online Identity Theft".

Email messages containing personal information that were previously not searchable by Google, Internet Explorer or Firefox became searchable sometime before June 2014, which many people may consider to be a violation of privacy. Zabasearch previously claimed to only share names and email addresses of users and information already published elsewhere, and not the text of personal messages.

However, numerous complaints about Zabasearch have been posted with various agencies - such as the Federal Trade Commission (FTC) regarding Internet privacy, the Privacy Rights Clearinghouse (PRC), and the California Office of Privacy Protection (COPP).
