= Tocsearch =

Database of terrorism

The TOC search (Terrorist and Organized Criminal Search) is a dynamic database which offers comprehensive information on global terrorist networks and helps researchers, analysts, students and others to prevent terrorism. It is the result of a common project realized by the Faculty of Security Studies and Faculty of Mathematics, University of Belgrade, which had started the program in December 2007. The scope of TOCSearch is to provide in-depth research and analysis on terrorist incidents, terrorist groups, organizations, their members, leaders and also links and relations between the individuals and groups. The purpose of the database is to integrate data from a variety of sources, including foreign and domestic news, professional security journals, reports and databases, and academic works.

== History ==
The starting point in the TOCSearch project was the data presented on the map Al-Qaeda Network: Principals, Supporters, Selected Cells and Significant Activities (1992–2004). The map was prepared by J. L. Boesen, Raytheon Genesis Facility Institute Reston (2004), using data derived from open sources. The data presented in the map were classified and stored in order to create backbone of the database.

== Classification ==
The data in the database are classified in seven entities: individuals, groups, organizations, supporters, actions, links and GMC reports. The database contains simple and advanced search features.

The simple search enables the researcher to explore the chosen entity by given keyword or part of an entity name. The advanced search feature is implemented for individuals, groups, organizations, supporters and actions. It is performed by using different properties: alias, belongs to organization, belongs to group, leader, religion, in relation with, type or actors of the attack, etc. All search results are presented together with the basic information on the found subjects, enabling in-depth search to be performed as well.

An important feature of TOCSearch is the fact that links between the mentioned terrorist-related categories are stored and classified in the database. The results of both simple and advanced searches provide information whether there is a link (active or inactive) from a particular item. The in-depth search feature gives more information on the found link. This is a unique feature of TOCSearch which no other terrorist database has had up to the point of its creation.

Incoming reports are sorted and stored by date in GMC section of the TOC search database. The George Marshall Center provided TOCSearch with their GMC reports archive and they send daily PTSS and other GMC reports. In this way, a constant refreshment of the base with up-to-date information has been provided. The TOCSearch simple search feature through GMC reports is implemented, which enables the exploration of GMC section by using keywords.

At each moment of using TOCSearch, one can immediately start a new search or switch to advanced search tool. While exploring the database, a researcher usually performs multiple searches. In order to help the user, a tool was implemented called the "select tool". This tool enables the user to pull individual important results obtained from different searches into one place. In this way, all the data that are essential in the research are available during the further exploration. The data in the “selection” tool are easily added or removed. By using option “Feedback” the user may send a message to an administrator on different topics (site bugs, erroneous data, comments, suggestions, etc.)

=== Preparation of reports ===
One of the key advantages of TOCSearch is the fact that its basic data source is verified information from the reports prepared and provided by George C Marshall European Center for Security Studies. The reports are produced by a special newsletter service supporting the counter-terrorism course at The George C. Marshall European Center for Security Studies, and it is created for educational purposes only. The newsletter is produced from the open-source media reports by GMC postgraduate students and verified by senior experts and counter-terrorism officers. This is the main reason why PTSS has been chosen as the main data source for TOCSearch. Besides PTSS Reports, GMC also publishes several other reports based on different open source data, such as: Department of Homeland Security Report (DHS), Terrorism Open Source Intelligence Report (TOSIR), Insurgency Literature Review (ILR) and Terrorism Literature Report (TLR).

=== Availability of data ===
The information in TOCSearch's database is constantly updated from GMC reports and other publicly available, open-source materials. These include electronic news archives, existing data sets, secondary source materials such as books and journals, and legal documents. The development team performs constant verification of the data by comparing it with other sources and by internal checking of the data and related records.

It is also important to provide the protection of data stored in the database. In this scope, two levels of data access are implemented. The first level is named “blue key” and it is available for students and researchers in academic institutions and research centers. The “blue key” enables the access to all open-source data stored in the base. The second level of data access, named “red key” is reserved for legal authorities, state institutions, and state government. The “red key” opens the part of the database with confidential data. The owner of the “red key” also has access to the open source data, as the “blue key” owner. Only state institutions and agencies which have a contract with TOCSearch have an access to the red key data and are red key members.

== Future uses ==
In the next phase of the project, several analytical features are to be incorporated in the database. Analytical tools will provide statistical information analysis of the global terrorist network. A researcher will be able to analyze terrorism trends over time and to compare different aspects of terrorism between countries, regions and terrorist groups (for example: type of terrorist attacks, level of organization, tactics, communication level, size of a terrorist group, age or race of its members, and many others). The results of statistical analysis will be presented graphically in various charts, showing the dependencies and / or the comparisons of the chosen aspects. The chart type can also be chosen by the user.

An analytically focused system will be used to understand the structure of different terrorist organizations with respect to particular attack types or regions of their activity. By using this system, intelligence analysts will be able to develop hypotheses and then validate them (or not) against the data in the database. In this way, it will be possible to provide certain predictions of international terrorism trends, seasonality, and periodicity of terrorist events.

In the future phase of the project, image search features are also planned. This tool will enable to search the image data base for related photographs of individuals or terrorist attacks by using keywords (individual's name, group / organization name, or the part of the name, specific terrorist incident, date, etc.).

Regarding the practical aspects of the database, the TOCSearch data were primarily collected by academic groups. This means that the development team was under no political or government pressure in terms of how to collect the data or how to classify them. Although TOCSearch is still in its construction phase, it has already been used in the purpose of Security of the Olympic Games in Beijing 2008, and was also used in the purpose of Security of the World Championship in Football 2010.
