= ISBNdb.com =

Online bibliographic database

- Website type: Bibliographic database
- Founded: 2001
- Country of origin: United States
- Industry: Internet, E-commerce, Big Data
- Website: isbndb.com
- Launched: 2001
- Current status: Active
- Written in: PHP

ISBNdb.com is an online bibliographic database of book metadata, founded in 2001. In July 2026, the company drew media coverage and criticism after its website advertised service to source print books for artificial intelligence companies seeking training data – a practice associated with destructive book scanning. Following the coverage, ISBNdb removed the page and said the offer had been a test of demand for service it "never brought to life".

== Business model ==
ISBNdb provides limited book metadata free of charge through its web interface; a paid subscription provides access to additional metadata fields and API access.

=== Sourcing books for AI training ===
In July 2026, ISBNdb received significant media coverage after its website advertised a service to source print books in bulk for AI companies seeking training data. The company later said the offer was a test "to explore demand for a service we never brought to life". The issue was first raised by 404 Media, which reported that ISBNdb claimed they can keep the identity of AI companies secret while sourcing books, noting that AI companies are aware that destroying books is bad publicity. According to the report, ISBNdb's website wrote that "Every project begins with a legally binding non-disclosure agreement. Your identity, strategy, and acquisition targets are never disclosed." The page also claimed ISBNdb could procure up to one million books per order for the AI companies, including of “older, rare and specialist volumes”.

The story was met with significant outrage. The Daily Telegraph described the process as "cultural barbarism" and reported that billionaire Elon Musk responded to the concern regarding ISBNdb, saying that "I've asked the SpaceX AI team to preserve any rare books in a library and scan them the hard way rather than just cutting off the spine and scanning."

Technology website Futurism explained the rationale of such service, writing that by buying physical books and scanning them, the AI companies took advantage of the first-sale doctrine, which allows a buyer to do what they want with the books without the original copyright holder’s say-so.

Following the media coverage, ISBNdb removed the webpage which offered the book purchase services for AI companies. A spokesperson of the company told The Daily Telegraph that while ISBNdb offered the service, it was a test "to explore demand for a service we never brought to life".

== See also ==
- Amazon Standard Identification Number – Alphanumeric unique identifier
- Bibliographic record – Metadata describing a particular resource
- Internet Speculative Fiction Database – Online database of written speculative fiction and its creators
- ISBN – Unique numeric book identifier since 1970
- Library of Congress Control Number – Numbering system for catalog records
- MARC standards – Digital formats for library cataloguing
- ONIX for Books – XML format for sharing bibliographic data
- Open Library – Online project for book data of the Internet Archive
- Project Panama – Digital piracy and destructive book scanning operation
