= FINDbase =

Content
- Description: Genetic variation allele frequencies

Contact
- Research center: University of Patras, Patras, Greece.
- Laboratory: Department of Pharmacy, School of Health Sciences, Faculty of Engineering
- Authors: Marianthi Georgitsi
- Primary citation: Georgitsi & al. (2011)
- Release date: 2006

Access
- Website: http://www.findbase.org

The Frequency of INherited Disorders database (FINDbase) is a database of frequencies of causative genetic variations worldwide. FINDbase was founded in 2006 to be a relational database for these frequencies of causative genetic variations of inherited genetic disorders, as well as pharmacogenetic markers. Out of all the national/ethnic mutation databases (NEMDBs), FINDbase has the most content and since all the entries are collected from various populations worldwide, it is seen as a great resource for population-specific information.

== See also ==
- Genetic variation
