= Pulsar (watch) =

Watch brand

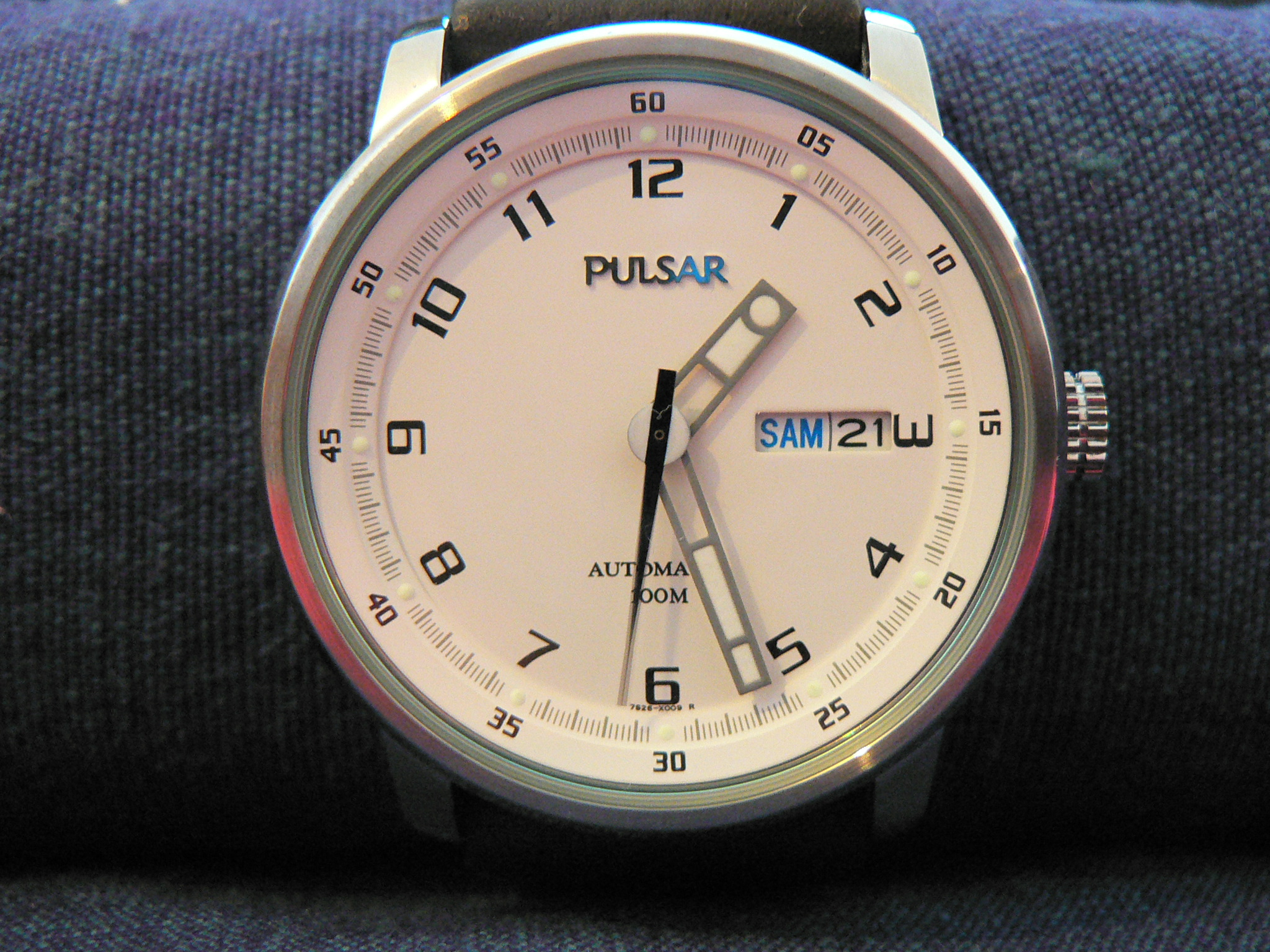
A modern analog Pulsar watch

Pulsar is a watch brand and currently a Seiko Watch Corporation of America (SCA) division. Pulsar was the world's first electronic digital watch, created by Bulgarian engineer and NASA scientist Peter Petroff, which was launched in the early 1970s. Current Pulsar watches are mostly analog and use the same movements in Seikos such as the 7T62 quartz chronograph movement.

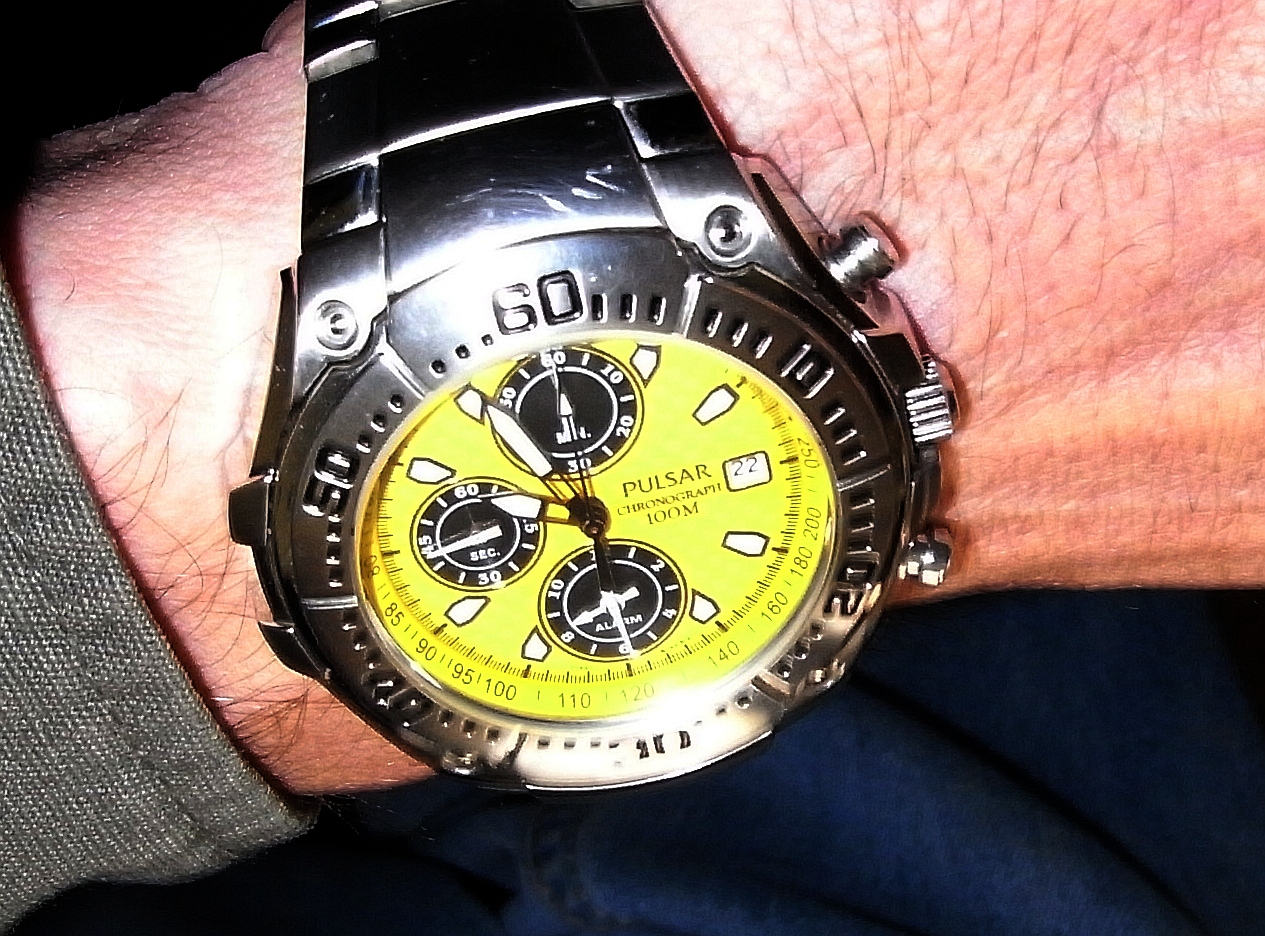
Pulsar quartz chronograph

== History ==
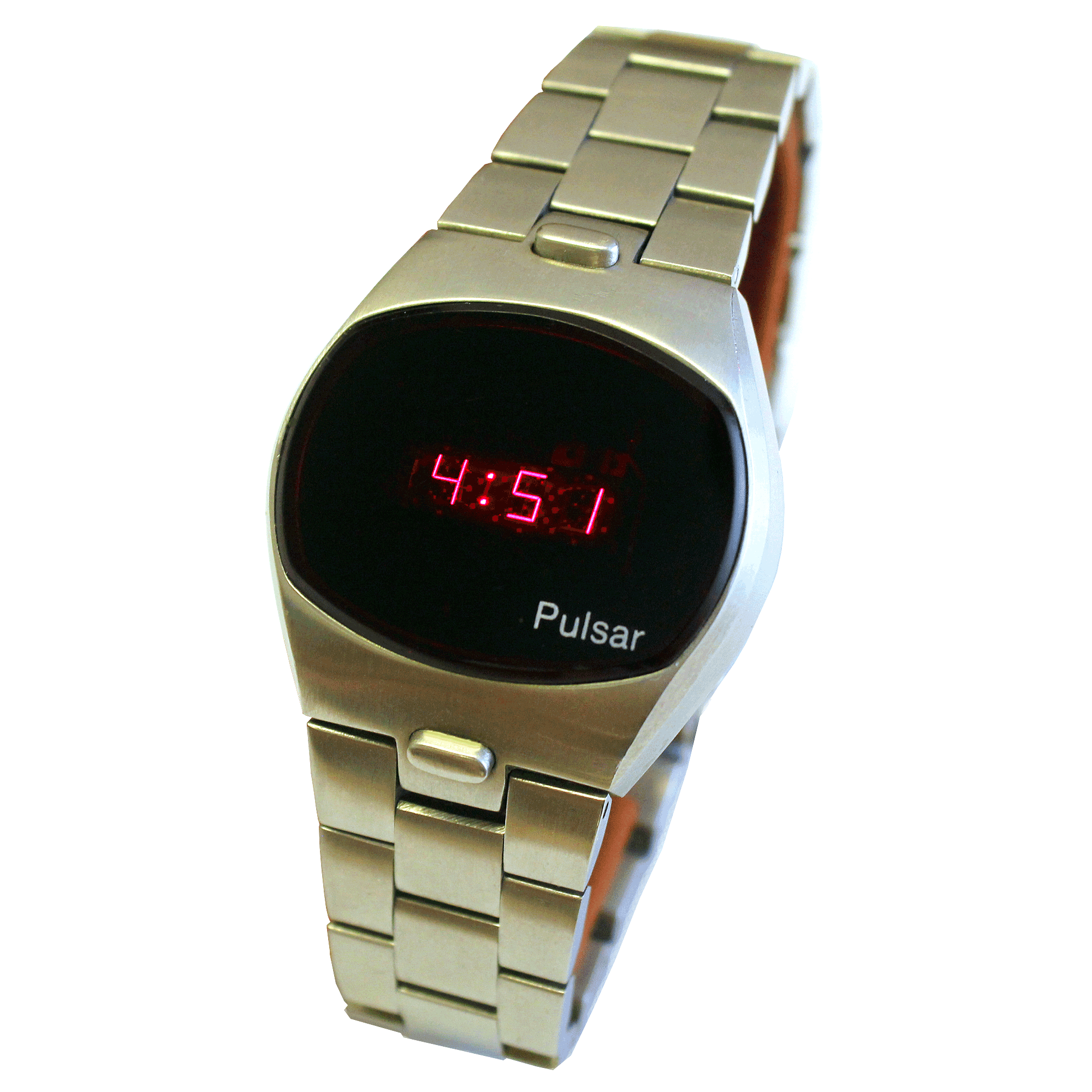
Pulsar P4 Time Computer with LED display ref. 3215-2 mens stainless steel watch circa 1975 made in the USA

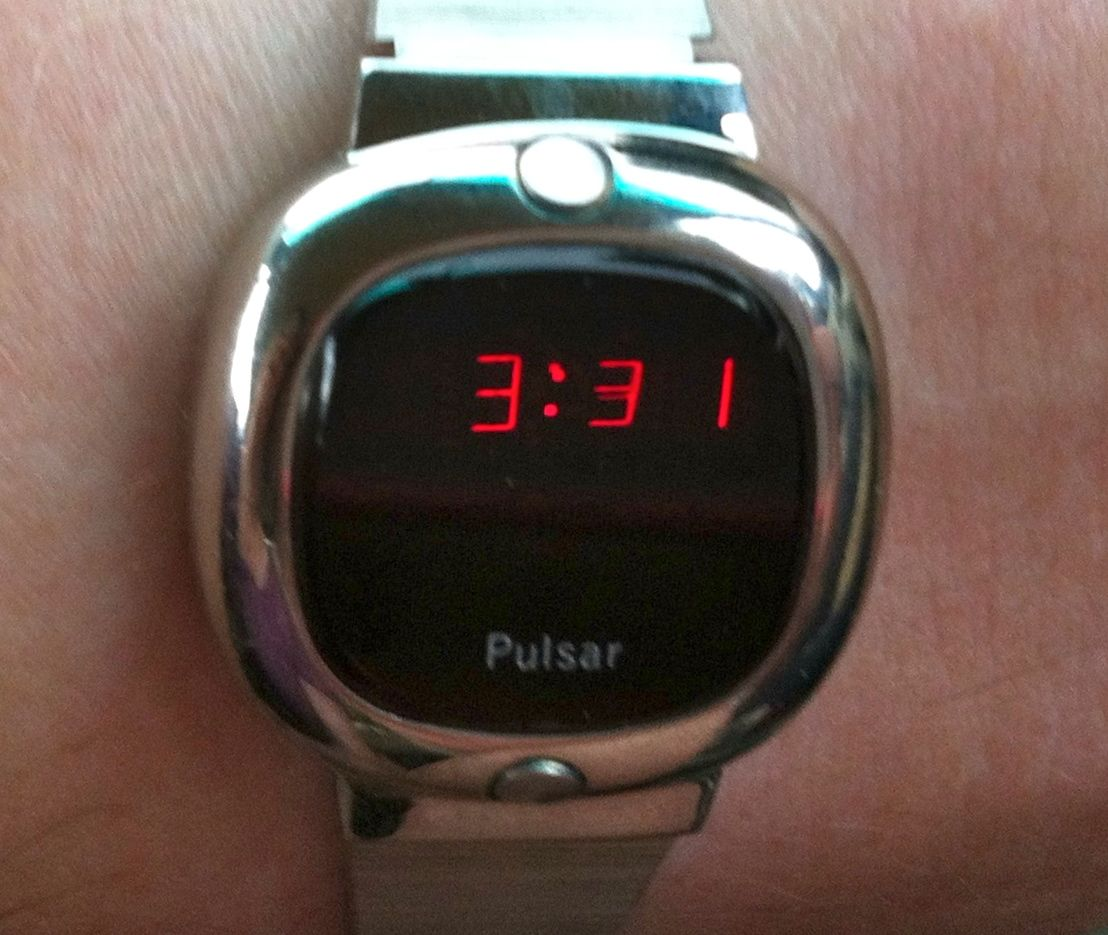
A Pulsar LED watch from 1976

In 1970, Pulsar was a brand of the American Hamilton Watch Company which first announced that it was making and bringing the LED watch to market. It was developed jointly by American companies Hamilton and Electro/Data Inc. In the spring of 1972, the first Pulsar watch was marketed by Hamilton Watch (the parent company, not the Hamilton Watch Division). With an 18-carat gold case, the world's first all-electronic digital watch was also the first to use a digital display created with light-emitting diodes (LEDs). A button was pressed to display the time. The first Pulsar initially sold for $2,100 ($16,300 in 2024 dollars). In October 1972, the Potpourri segment in the issue of Playboy mentioned the first Pulsar, and included a photo. The Hamilton Pulsar P2 2900 was featured in the 1973 James Bond movie "Live and Let Die". In 1975, a digital Pulsar with a built-in calculator was released. In 1978, Seiko Corporation acquired the Pulsar brand, it is mid-grade of their product range. By 2020, Seiko had ceased selling its Pulsar in the United Kingdom.

In January 2023 Seiko merged the brand with ALBA with a statement that Pulsar watches were no longer manufactured.
