= Bibliography of encyclopedias: film, radio, television and mass communications =

This is a list of reference works involves encyclopedias and encyclopedic dictionaries of any language published on the subject of film/cinema, radio, television, and mass communications, including related biographical dictionaries of actors, directors, etc.

Entries are in the English language except where noted.

== Animation ==
- Clements, Jonathan; McCarthy, Helen (2001). The Anime Encyclopedia: A Guide to Japanese Animation Since 1917. US: Stone Bridge Press.
- McCarthy, Helen (1996). The Anime Movie Guide: Japanese Animation since 1983. London: Titan. ISBN 1-85286-631-4
- Erickson, Hal (2005). Television Cartoon Shows: An Illustrated Encyclopedia, 1949 through 2003. Mcfarland & company. ISBN 978-0-7864-2099-5.
- Kapkov, Sergey (2007). Encyclopedia of Domestic Animation (in Russian). Russia: Algorithm-kniga.
- Lenburg, Jeff (1991). The Encyclopedia of Animated Cartoons. Facts on File.
- Stuckmann, Chris (2018). Anime Impact: The Movies and Shows that Changed the World of Japanese Animation. Mango Media. ISBN 1633537323.
- Anime News Network [online database]
- The Big Cartoon DataBase [online database]

== Film ==
- Abel, Richard (2005). Encyclopedia of Early Cinema. Taylor & Francis. ISBN 978-0-415-23440-5.
- American Film Institute (1941). The American Film Institute Catalog of Motion Pictures. R. R. Bowker. Google Books.
- Armstrong, Richard B.; Armstrong, Mary Willems (2009). Encyclopedia of Film Themes, Settings and Series. McFarland & Company Incorporated. ISBN 978-0-7864-4572-1.
- Bawden, Liz-Anne, ed. (1976). The Oxford Companion to Film. New York: Oxford University Press. OCLC 2346001.
- Blumenfeld, Robert (1 March 2009). Blumenfeld's Dictionary of Acting and Show Business. Hal Leonard Corporation. ISBN 978-0-87910-363-7.
- Branigan, Edward; Buckland, Warren (eds.) (2015). The Routledge Encyclopedia of Film Theory. Routledge. ISBN 9781138849150.
- Brown, Gene, ed. (1984). The New York Times Encyclopedia of Film. Times Books.
- Cawkwell, Tim; Smith, John Milton (1972). The World Encyclopedia of Film. Studio Vista. ISBN 978-0-289-70295-6.
- Microsoft Corporation (1992–97). Microsoft Cinemania [digital database].
- Craggs, Stewart R. (1998). Soundtracks: An international dictionary of composers for film. Ashgate. ISBN 1859281893.
- Fernett, Gene (1988). American Film Studios: An Historical Encyclopedia. McFarland.
- Halliwell, Leslie (1977). Halliwell's Film Guide. HarperCollins.
- —— (1993). Halliwell's Filmgoer's Companion (10th ed.). HarperCollins.
- Herbert, Stephen; McKernan, Luke (1996). Who's Who of Victorian Cinema. British Film Institute.
- Katz, Ephraim; Nolen, Ronald Dean (2 September 2008). The film encyclopedia: the complete guide to film and the film industry. Collins. ISBN 978-0-06-143285-9.
- Maltin, Leonard (1969–2014). Leonard Maltin's Movie Guide. New American Library.
- Lyon, Christopher; Doll, Susan (1984). The Macmillan Dictionary of Films and Filmmakers: Films. MacMillan. ISBN 978-0-333-33525-3.
- Magill, Frank N. Magill's American Film Guide. Salem Press.
- —— (1980–85). Magill's Survey of Cinema. Salem Press.
- McGee, Marty (2010). Encyclopedia of Motion Picture Sound. McFarland & Company Incorporated. ISBN 978-0-7864-4916-3.
- Monaco, James (1991). The Encyclopedia of Film. Perigee Books. ISBN 0399516042.
- Nash, Jay Robert; Ross, Stanley R. (1985–87). The Motion Picture Guide. CineBooks.
- The New York Times (1913–74). The New York Times Film Reviews. The New York Times and Arno Press. OCLC 2293207, 3463329.
- Noriega, José Luis Sánchez (2004). Diccionario temático del cine (in Spanish). Cátedra. ISBN 978-84-376-2191-3.
- Nowlan, Robert A.; Nowlan, Gwendolyn Wright (1988). An Encyclopedia of Film Festivals. JAI Press.
- Roddick, Nick; Eames, John Douglas (1985). Encyclopedia of Great Movies. Woodbury Press. ISBN 978-0-7064-2460-7.
- Summers, Howard (2018). The Guide To Movie Lists: Filmographies of the World. Howcom Services. ISBN 978-1-5499-4022-4.
- —— (2018). The Guide To Movie Lists 2: Genres, Subjects and Themes. Howcom Services. ISBN 978-1-982904-72-2.
- —— (2018). The Guide To Movie Lists 3: Appendices. Howcom Services. ISBN 978-1-983366-14-7.
- Thomas, Nicholas; Vinson, James (1990–93). The International Dictionary of Films and Filmmakers (2nd ed.)/ St. James Press.
- Thomson, David (1975). A Biographical Dictionary of Cinema. Secker & Warburg.
- —— (2014). The New Biographical Dictionary of Film. Alfred A. Knopf. ISBN 9780375711848.
- Torres, Augusto M. (1996). Diccionario Espasa cine español (in Spanish). Espasa-Calpe. ISBN 978-84-239-9241-6.
- Weldon, Michael (15 September 1989). The Psychotronic Encyclopedia of Film. Plexus. ISBN 978-0-85965-156-1.
- Winnert, Derek (1995). The Ultimate Encyclopedia of the Movies: The Definitive Illustrated Guide to the Movies. Carlton. ISBN 978-1-85868-079-8.
- AllMovie [online database].

=== Specific to genre/film subject ===
- Aitken, Ian (2006). Encyclopedia of the Documentary Film. Routledge. ISBN 978-0-415-97639-8.
- Edgington, K.; Erskine, Thomas L.; Welsh, James (2010). Encyclopedia of Sports Films. Scarecrow Press. ISBN 978-0-8108-7652-1.
- Hall, Phil (2004). The Encyclopedia of Underground Movies: Films from the Fringes of Cinema. M. Wiese Productions. ISBN 978-0-941188-95-1.
- Hardy, Phil (1983–98). The Aurum Film Encyclopedia, 4 vols. UK: Aurum Press.
  - 1983. Volume 1: The Western (ISBN 978-0-7064-2555-0; Google Books)
  - 1984. Volume 2: Science Fiction (ISBN 978-0-7064-2557-4; Google Books)
  - 1984. Volume 3: Horror
  - 1998. Volume 4: The Gangster Film.
- Henderson, C. J. (2001). The Encyclopedia of Science Fiction Movies. Facts On File. ISBN 978-0-8160-4567-9.
- Mayer, Geoff; McDonnell, Brian (2007). Encyclopedia of Film Noir. ABC-CLIO. ISBN 978-0-313-33306-4.
- Mazur, Eric Michael (2011). Encyclopedia of Religion and Film. ABC-CLIO. ISBN 978-0-313-33072-8.
- Milne, Tom; Hardy, Phil (1986). The Encyclopedia of Horror Movies. Harper & Row. ISBN 978-0-06-055050-9.
- Myford, Eric (2010). The Encyclopedia of Horror & Suspense Movies Volume I. CreateSpace. ISBN 978-1-4538-2100-8.
- Picart, Caroline Joan (2004). The Holocaust Film Sourcebook. Praeger. ISBN 0275978508.
- Spicer, Andrew (30 March 2010). Historical Dictionary of Film Noir. Scarecrow Press. ISBN 978-0-8108-5960-9.

Action / war

- Davenport, Robert Ralsey (2004). The Encyclopedia of War Movies: The Authoritative Guide to Movies about Wars of the Twentieth Century. Facts On File/Checkmark Books. ISBN 978-0-8160-4479-5.
- Lentz, Robert J. (2003). Korean War Filmography: 91 English Language Features Through 2000. McFarland. ISBN 0786410469.
- Palmer, Bill; Palmer, Karen; Meyers, Richard (1995). The Encyclopedia of Martial Arts Movies. Scarecrow Press. ISBN 978-0-8108-3027-1.
- Picart, Caroline Joan (2004). The Holocaust Film Sourcebook. Praeger. ISBN 0275978508.
- Rubin, Steven Jay (2003). The Complete James Bond Movie Encyclopedia. Contemporary Books. ISBN 978-0-07-141246-9.

Musicals

- Green, Stanley (1981). Encyclopedia of the Musical Film. Oxford University Press.
- Hirschhorn, Clive. (1981). Hollywood Musical. Crown.
- Hischak, Thomas S. (2008). The Oxford Companion to the American Musical: Theatre, Film, and Television. Oxford University Press. ISBN 978-0-19-533533-0.

=== Specific to culture ===
- Slide, Anthony (1986). International Film Industry: A Historical Dictionary. Greenwood.

American / Hollywood

- Allon, Yoram; Cullen, Del; Patterson, Hannah (2002). Contemporary North American film directors: A Wallflower critical guide. Wallflower. ISBN 9781903364529.
- American Film Institute (1995). The American Film Institute Catalog of Motion Pictures Produced in the United States Film Beginnings, 1893-1910 : A Work in Progress. edited by Elias Savada. Scarecrow. ISBN 978-0-8108-3021-9.
- —— (1996). American Film Institute Catalog of Motion Pictures Produced in the United States: Feature Films 1961–1970. Hollywood Film Archive. ISBN 978-0-913616-45-1.
- Dimare, Philip C. (2011). Movies in American History: An Encyclopedia. ABC-CLIO. ISBN 978-1-59884-296-8.
- Siegel, Scott; Siegel, Barbara (1990). Encyclopedia of Hollywood. Facts on File.
- Slide, Anthony (1986). The American Film Industry: A Historical Dictionary. Greenwood.

Asian

- McCarthy, Helen (1996). The Anime Movie Guide: Japanese Animation since 1983. London: Titan. ISBN 1-85286-631-4
- Rajadhyaksha, Ashish; Willemen, Paul (1998). Encyclopedia of Indian Cinema. British Film Institute. ISBN 978-0-19-564768-6.
- Stuckmann, Chris (2018). Anime Impact: The Movies and Shows that Changed the World of Japanese Animation. Mango Media. ISBN 1633537323.
- Weisser, Thomas; Weisser, Yuko Mihara (1998). Japanese Cinema Encyclopedia. Vital Books.
  - Volume 1: The Horror, Fantasy, and Sci Fi Films (ISBN 1889288519)
  - Volume 2: The Sex Films (ISBN 1889288527)

European

- Allon, Yoram; Cullen, Del; Patterson, Hannah (2001). Contemporary British and Irish film directors: A Wallflower Critical Guide. Wallflower. ISBN 9781903364222.
- Burton, Alan; Chibnall, Steve (2013). Historical Dictionary of British Cinema. Scarecrow. ISBN 9780810867949.
- Hoxha, Abaz (1999). Enciklopedi E Kinematografise Shqiptare (in Albanian). Seksioni i Akademisë Shqiptaro-Amerikane të Shkencave dhe Arteve. ISBN 978-99927-643-0-5.
- Kapkov, Sergey (2007). Encyclopedia of Domestic Animation (in Russian). Russia: Algorithm-kniga.
- McFarlane, Brian (2011). Encyclopedia of British Film. Methuen Publishing. ISBN 978-0-413-77702-7.
- McFarlane, Brian; Slide, Anthony (2003). The Encyclopedia of British Film. Methuen. ISBN 978-0-413-77301-2.
- Rockett, Kevin (1996). The Irish Filmography: Fiction Films 1896-1996. Dublin: Red Mountain Media. ISBN 978-0-9526698-0-7.
- Vincendeau, Ginette (1995). Encyclopedia of European Cinema. Facts on File. ISBN 978-0-8160-3394-2.

Latin & Hispanic

- Baugh, Scott L. (13 April 2012). Latino American Cinema: An Encyclopedia of Movies, Stars, Concepts, and Trends. ABC-CLIO. ISBN 978-0-313-38036-5.
- Keller, Gary D.; Keller, Estela (1997). A Biographical Handbook of Hispanics and United States Film. Bilingual Press/Editorial Bilingüe. ISBN 0927534568.
- Osuna, Alfonso J. García (2003). The Cuban Filmography, 1897 Through 2001. McFarland. ISBN 0786412755.

=== Online film databases ===
- AFI Catalog of Feature Films
- AllMovie
- Complete Index to World Film
- Filmweb (in Polish)
- IMDb (crowd-sourced)

Specialized

- Art of the Title — title sequences
- Box Office Mojo — box-office revenue
- The Big Cartoon DataBase — animation
- FindAnyFilm — film availability
- Internet Movie Cars Database — motor vehicles in film
- Internet Movie Firearms Database — firearms in film
- Little Golden Guy — Academy Awards stats
- Lumiere — film admissions in Europe
- Metacritic — aggregated reviews
- Moviemistakes.com — production mistakes
- The Numbers — box-office revenue
- Movie Review Query Engine — review index
- Rotten Tomatoes — aggregated reviews

Culture-specific

- AlloCiné — French cinema
- Animator.ru — Russian and Soviet cinema
- Anime News Network — Japanese animation
- BFI Film & TV Database — British cinema
- Box Office India — Indian cinema
- Christian Film Database — Christian cinema
- Ciné-Ressources — French film archives
- Cinenacional.com — Argentine cinema
- Czech Movie Heaven — Czech and Slovak cinema
- Danish Film Database — Danish cinema
- Elonet — Finnish cinema
- Filmarchives online — European film archives
- Filmfront — Norwegian cinema
- Filmportal.de — German cinema
- Filmweb — Polish cinema (and world cinema)
- HanCinema — Korean cinema
- Hong Kong Cinemagic — Chinese-language cinema from China, Hong Kong, and Taiwan
- Hong Kong Movie DataBase — Hong Kong cinema
- Japanese Movie Database — Japanese cinema
- KinoPoisk — Russian cinema
- Korean Movie Database — Korean cinema
- Nollywood Reinvented — Nigerian cinema
- PORT.hu — Central European cinema
- Stopklatka.pl — Polish cinema
- Svensk mediedatabas — search engine for audiovisual works by the National Library of Sweden
- Swedish Film Database — Swedish cinema

Adult films

- Adult Film Database
- Internet Adult Film Database

== Media, entertainment, communications ==
- Abercrombie, Nicholas, and Brian Longhurst. 2007. The Penguin Dictionary of Media Studies. Penguin Books. ISBN 9780141014272.
- Barnouw, Eric. 1989. International Encyclopedia of Communications. Oxford University Press.
- Damesi, Marcel. 2000. Encyclopedic Dictionary of Semiotics, Media, and Communications. Toronto: University of Toronto Press. ISBN 0802047831.
- Hartley, John. 2002. Communication, cultural and media studies: the key concepts. Routledge. ISBN 0415268885.
- Schement, Jorge Reina. 2002. Encyclopedia of Communication and Information. Macmillan Reference USA. ISBN 0028653866.
- Marquis Who's Who. 1985–. Who's Who in Media & Communications.
- —— 1989–99. Who's Who in Entertainment.
- Monaco, James. 1971. The Dictionary of New Media: The New Digital World of Video, Audio, and Print. Preview.
- Studio System by Gracenote [online entertainment database]
- Variety Insight [online entertainment database]

=== Media companies and franchises ===
- Shields, Brian, and Kevin Sullivan. 2008. WWE Encyclopedia: The Definitive Guide to World Wrestling Entertainment. Dorling Kindersley.
- Smith, Dave. 1996. Disney A to Z: The Official Encyclopedia (1st ed.). New York: Hyperion. ISBN 0-7868-6223-8.
- Velasco, Raymond L. 1984. A Guide to the Star Wars Universe (1st ed.). Del Rey.
- List of Star Trek reference books
  - Trimble, Bjo. 1976. Star Trek Concordance (2nd ed.). Ballantine Books.

=== Mass media ===
- Downing, John. 2011. Encyclopedia of Social Movement Media. SAGE Publishing. ISBN 9780761926887.
- Hixson, Richard. 1989. Mass Media and the Constitution: An Encyclopedia of Supreme Court Cases. Garland.
- Hudson, Robert V. 1987. Mass Media: A Chronological Encyclopedia of Television, Radio, Motion Pictures, Magazines, Newspapers, and Books in the United States. Garland.

== Radio ==
- Brooks, Tim, and Earle Marsh. 1979. The Complete Directory to Prime Time Network and Cable TV Shows 1946–Present. US: Ballantine Books.
- Dunning, John. 1976. Tune In Yesterday: The Ultimate Encyclopedia of Old Radio, 1925-76. Prentice-Hall.
- —— 1998. On the Air: The Encyclopedia of Old-Time Radio (1st ed.). New York: Oxford University Press. ISBN 0195076788, 978-0195076783.
- Terrace, Vincent. 1981. Radio's Golden Years: The Encyclopedia of Radio Programs, 1930–60. San Diego: A. S. Barnes. OCLC 6355555.
- Swartz, Jon, and Robert Reinert. 1993. Handbook of Old-Time Radio: A Comprehensive Guide to Golden Age Radio Listening and Collecting. Scarecrow Press.

== Theatre and performing arts ==
- Banham, Martin. 1989. The Cambridge Guide to World Theatre. Cambridge University Press.
- Benson, Eugene, and L. W. Conolly. 1989. The Oxford Companion to Canadian Theatre. Oxford University Press.
- Dumur, Guy. 1965. Encyclopédie de la Pléiade 19: Histoire des spectacles (in French). Éditions Gallimard. Google Books.
- Esslin, Martin. 1977. Encyclopedia of World Theater. Scribner's.
- Gänzl, Kurt, and Andrew Lamb. 1989. Gänzl's Book of the Musical Theatre. Schirmer.
- Gelli, Piero 1978. Encyclopedia of Performing Arts (in Italian). Garzanti.
- Green, Stanley. 1976. Encyclopedia of the Musical Theatre. Dodd, Mead.
- Hartnoll, Phyllis. 1983. Oxford Companion to the Theatre. Oxford University Press.
- Hartnoll, Phyllis, and Peter Found. 1992. Concise Oxford Companion to the Theatre. Oxford Univ. Press.
- Hawkins-Dady, Mark; Shrimpton, Leanda; Pickering, David (1996). International Dictionary of Theatre: Actors, directors, and designers. St. James Press. ISBN 978-1-55862-097-1.
- Lounsbury, Warren C., and Norman Boulanger. 1989. Theatre Backstage from A to Z. University of Washington Press.
- —— 1992. Theatre Lighting from A to Z. University of Washington Press.
- Patterson, Michael (2 June 2005). The Oxford Dictionary of Plays. Oxford University Press, USA. ISBN 978-0-19-860417-4.
- Packard, William. 1988. Facts on File Dictionary of the Theatre. Facts on File.
- Thurston, James. 1992. The What, Where, When of Theater Props: An Illustrated Chronology from Arrowheads to Video Games. Betterway Books.
- Vince, Ronald W. 1989. A Companion to the Medieval Theatre. Greenwood.
- Zylbercweig, Zalmen, ed. 1931–69. Lexicon of Yiddish Theatre.
- Encyclopedie Du Theatre Contemporain (in French). Textbook Publishers. 2003. ISBN 978-0-7581-5552-8.
- Enciclopédia Itaú Cultural de Teatro (in Portuguese) [online database]. Brazil: Ministerio da Cultura, Government of Brazil. 2001–present.

=== American theatre ===
- Boardman, Gerald. 1984. The Oxford Companion to American Theatre. Oxford University Press.
- —— 1987. Concise Oxford Companion to American Theatre. Oxford University Press.
- Bronner, Edwin. 1979. Encyclopedia of the American Theatre, 1900–1975. A. S. Barnes.
- Navarro, Jerónimo Herrera. 1993. Catálogo de autores teatrales del siglo XVIII (in Spanish). Spain: Fundación Universitaria Española. ISBN 8473923367.
- Sampson, Henry T. 1988. The Ghost Walks: A Chronological History of Blacks in Show Business, 1865–1910. Scarecrow Press.
- Wilmeth, Don B., and Tice L. Miller. 1993. The Cambridge Guide to American Theatre. Cambridge University Press.
- Woll, Allen. 1983. Dictionary of the Black Theatre: Broadway, Off-Broadway, and Selected Harlem Theatre. Greenwood.

==== American musical theatre ====
- Bloom, Ken. American Song: The Complete Musical Theatre Companion. Facts on File, 1985.
- Boardman, Gerald. 1981. American Operetta. Oxford University Press.
- —— 1982. American Musical Comedy. Oxford UP.
- —— 1985. American Musical Revue. Oxford UP.
- —— 1992. The American Musical Theatre: A Chronicle. Oxford UP.
- Bordman, Gerald; Hischak, Thomas S. (2004). The Oxford Companion to American Theatre. Oxford University Press. ISBN 978-0-19-516986-7.
- Hischak, Thomas S. 1993. Stage It with Music: An Encyclopedic Guide to the American Musical Theatre. Greenwood.
- —— 2008. The Oxford Companion to the American Musical: Theatre, Film, and Television. Oxford University Press. ISBN 978-0-19-533533-0.
- Lewine, Richard, and Alfred Simon. 1984. Songs of the Theater. H. W. Wilson.

==== New York / Broadway ====
- Bloom, Ken. 1991. Broadway: An Encyclopedic Guide to the History, People, and Places of Times Square. Facts on File.
- Hischak, Thomas S. 2006. Enter the playmakers: Directors and choreographers on the New York stage. Scarecrow Press. ISBN 0810857472.
- Leiter, Samuel L. 1985. The Encyclopedia of the New York Stage, 1920–1930. Greenwood.
- —— 1989. The Encyclopedia of the New York Stage, 1930–1940. Greenwood.
- —— 1992. The Encyclopedia of the New York Stage, 1940–1950. Greenwood.

=== Asian theatre ===
- Brandon, James R. 1993. Cambridge Guide to Asian Theatre. Cambridge University Press.
- Leiter, Samuel L. 1979. Art of Kabuki: Famous Plays in Performance. University of California Press.
- —— 1979. Kabuki Encyclopedia: An English-Language Adaptation of Kabuki Jiten. Greenwood.

=== Ballet ===
- Balanchine, George, and Francis Mason. 1989. 101 Stories of the Great Ballets. Doubleday.
- Bremser, Martha. 1993. International Dictionary of Ballet. St. James Press.
- Clarke, Mary, and Clement Crisp. 1981. Ballet Goer's Guide. Knopf.
- Koegler, Horst. 1982. The Concise Oxford Dictionary of Ballet. Oxford University Press.

=== European theatre ===
- Cooper, Barbara T. 1998. French Dramatists, 1789–1914. Gale Research. ISBN 0787618470.
- Demastes, William W. 1996. British Playwrights, 1956–1995: A Research and Production Sourcebook. Greenwood Press. ISBN 0313287597.
- Kosch, Wilhelm, and Ingrid Bigler-Marschall. 1953–2012. Deutsches Theater-Lexikon. Germany: De Gruyter. ISBN 978-3-11-028755-4.
- Navarro, Jerónimo Herrera. 1993. Catálogo de autores teatrales del siglo XVIII. Fundación Universitaria Española. ISBN 8473923367.
- O'Neil, Mary Anne. 2006. Twentieth-century French Dramatists. Thomson Gale. ISBN 9780787681395.
- Parker, Mary. 1998. Spanish dramatists of the Golden Age: A bio-bibliographical sourcebook. Greenwood Press. ISBN 0313288933.
- —— 2002. Modern Spanish dramatists: A bio-bibliographical sourcebook. Greenwood Press. ISBN 0313305781.
- Richel, Veronica C. 1988. The German Stage, 1767-1890: A directory of playwrights and plays. Greenwood Press. ISBN 0313249903.
- Theaterlexikon der Schweiz (online database). Institute for Theater Studies, University of Bern
  - Print edition: Kotte, Andreas, ed. (2005). Theaterlexikon der Schweiz (in German). Zurich: Chronos. ISBN 978-3-0340-0715-3. LCCN 2007423414. OCLC 62309181. (French edition: Dictionnaire du théâtre en Suisse; Italian: Dizionario Teatrale Svizzero; Romansh: Lexicon da teater svizzer)

== Television ==
- Aaker, Everett (2011). Encyclopedia of Early Television Crime Fighters: All Regular Cast Members in American Crime and Mystery Series, 1948–1959. McFarland & Company Incorporated. ISBN 978-0-7864-6409-8.
- Beck, Ken; Clark, Jim (2002). The Encyclopedia of TV Pets: A Complete History of Television's Greatest Animal Stars. Thomas Nelson Inc. ISBN 978-1-55853-981-5.
- Brooks, Tim and Marsh, Earle (1992). The Complete Directory to Prime Time Network and Cable TV Shows 1946–present (5th ed.). Ballantine.
- Brown, Les (1992). Les Brown's Encyclopedia of Television (3rd ed.). Gale Research.
- Clements, Jonathan; Tamamuro, Motoko (2003). The Dorama Encyclopedia: A Guide to Japanese TV Drama Since 1953.
- Erickson, Hal (2005). Television Cartoon Shows: An Illustrated Encyclopedia, 1949 through 2003. Mcfarland & company. ISBN 978-0-7864-2099-5.
- —— (2009). Encyclopedia of Television Law Shows: Factual and Fictional Series About Judges, Lawyers and the Courtroom, 1948–2008. McFarland. ISBN 978-0-7864-3828-0.
- Fox Reality Channel (2009). The Encyclopedia of Reality Television: The Ultimate Guide to Over 20 Years of Reality TV from The Real World to Dancing with the Stars. Simon & Schuster. ISBN 978-1-4165-7055-4.
- Fulton, Roger (2000). The Encyclopedia of TV Science Fiction. Boxtree, 4th edition. ISBN 978-0-7522-1150-3.
- Hischak, Thomas S. (2008). The Oxford Companion to the American Musical: Theatre, Film, and Television. Oxford University Press. ISBN 978-0-19-533533-0.
- Lackmann, Ronald W. (2003). The Encyclopedia of 20th-Century American Television. Facts On File. ISBN 978-0-8160-4554-9.
- Langman, Larry; Molinari, Joseph A. (1990). The New Video Encyclopedia. New York: Garland. ISBN 0824082443.
- Maltin, Leonard (1969–2014). Leonard Maltin's TV Movies and Video Guide. New American Library.
- Newcomb, Horace (2004). Encyclopedia of Television (2nd ed.). CRC Press. ISBN 978-1-57958-411-5. The first edition is freely available online.
- Robinson, Mark A. (2011). Encyclopedia of Television Theme Songs. McFarland & Company Incorporated. ISBN 978-0-7864-6517-0.
- Schemering, Christopher (1985). The Soap Opera Encyclopedia. Ballantine Books.
- Slide, Anthony (1991). The Television Industry: A Historical Dictionary. Greenwood.
- Stuckmann, Chris (2018). Anime Impact: The Movies and Shows that Changed the World of Japanese Animation. Mango Media. ISBN 1633537323.
- Terrace, Vincent (1985–86). The Encyclopedia of Television: Series, Pilots, and Specials. Rev. ed., New York Zoetrope.
- —— (2011). Encyclopedia of Television Shows, 1925 Through 2010. McFarland & Company Incorporated. ISBN 978-0-7864-6477-7.
- —— (2011). Encyclopedia of Television Subjects, Themes and Settings. McFarland & Company Incorporated. ISBN 978-0-7864-6630-6.
- Waggett, Gerard J. (1997). The Soap Opera Encyclopedia. HarperPaperbacks.

=== Online TV databases ===
- Anime News Network — Japanese animation
- Art of the Title — title sequences
- The Big Cartoon DataBase — animation
- Filmfront — Norwegian TV and film
- HanCinema — Korean TV and film
- IMDb
- Internet Movie Firearms Database — firearms in TV and film
- KinoPoisk — Russian TV and film
- Metacritic — aggregated reviews
- Moviemistakes.com — production mistakes
- PORT.hu — Central European TV and film
- Rotten Tomatoes — aggregated reviews
- Stopklatka.pl — Polish TV and film

== Biography ==
- Contemporary Theatre, Film & Television. Cengage Gale. 1984–. ISSN 0749-064X.
- Morsberger, Robert Eustis, Stephen O. Lessek, and Randall Clark. 1984. American screenwriters. Gale Research. ISBN 0810309173.

=== Actors ===
- Brode, Douglas (15 October 2009). Shooting Stars of the Small Screen: Encyclopedia of TV Western Actors, 1946–present. University of Texas Press. ISBN 978-0-292-71849-4.
- Highfill, Philip H; Burnim, Kalman A; Langhans, Edward A. (20 October 1993). A Biographical Dictionary of Actors, Volume 16, W. West to Zwingman: Actresses, Musicians, Dancers, Managers, and Other Stage Personnel in London, 1660–1800. SIU Press. ISBN 978-0-8093-1803-2.
- Koon, Helene (September 1994). Gold Rush performers: a biographical dictionary of actors, singers, dancers, musicians, circus performers and minstrel players in America's Far West, 1848 to 1869. McFarland. ISBN 978-0-89950-923-5.
- Monush, Barry (2003). Screen World Presents the Encyclopedia of Hollywood Film Actors: From the silent era to 1965. Hal Leonard Corporation. ISBN 978-1-55783-551-2.
- Nungezer, Edwin (1968). A dictionary of actors and other persons associated with the public representation of plays in England before 1642. Greenwood Press.

=== Film directors ===
- Armes, Roy (23 August 2010). Arab Filmmakers of the Middle East: A Dictionary. Indiana University Press. ISBN 978-0-253-35518-8.
- Beaver, Frank Eugene (2006). Dictionary of Film Terms: The Aesthetic Companion To Film Art. Peter Lang. ISBN 978-0-8204-7298-0.
- Elert, Nicolet V.; Vasudevan, Aruna; Leanda Shrimpton (1997). International Dictionary of Films and Filmmakers: Writers and production artists. St. James Press. ISBN 978-1-55862-303-3.
- Foster, Gwendolyn Audrey (1995). Women Film Directors: An International Bio-Critical Dictionary. Greenwood Publishing Group. ISBN 978-0-313-28972-9.
- IFILM (1984–). Film directors: A complete guide. Lone Eagle. ISSN 0740-2872.
- Jarvis, Douglas (1985). Encyclopedia of Film Stars. Gallery Books. ISBN 978-0-8317-2795-6.
- Pendergast, Tom; Pendergast, Sara (2000). International Dictionary of Films and Filmmakers: Directors. St. James Press. ISBN 978-1-55862-451-1.
- Roberts, Jerry (15 June 2009). Encyclopedia of Television Film Directors. Scarecrow Press. ISBN 978-0-8108-6138-1.
- Roud, Richard (1980). Cinema: a critical dictionary : the major film-makers. Viking Press. ISBN 978-0-670-22257-5.
- Sadoul, Georges; Morris, Peter (1972). Dictionary of Film Makers. University of California Press. ISBN 978-0-520-02151-8.
- Wakeman, John (1987). World Film Directors: 1945–1985. H.W. Wilson. ISBN 978-0-8242-0763-2.

== See also ==
- Bibliography of encyclopedias
