= Danish Film Database =

Film archive and database

DFI
- Website type: Online database for Danish films
- Available in: Danish
- Owner: Danish Film Institute
- Creator: Col Needham (CEO)
- Website: dfi.dk
- Commercial: Yes
- Registration: Registration is optional, however, only registered members can write reviews, edit the site, and vote on ratings.
- Launched: November 2000; 25 years ago
- Current status: Active

The Danish Film Database (Danish: Filmdatabasen, formerly Danish National Filmography, Danish: Danmarks Nationalfilmografi), is a database maintained by the Danish Film Institute (DFI) about Danish films since 1896 including silent films, short films, and documentary films. When it went online in November 2000, it included data on all c. 1,000 Danish films produced between 1968 and 2000, and c. 10,000 persons, which by 2014 had been expanded to 22,000 titles, 106,000 persons and 6,000 companies. A media gallery with photos, programmes, poster scans, and trailers is available. The database also includes information on premiere dates for foreign films in Danish cinemas since 2000.

== See also ==
- AllMovie
- AllMusic – a similar database, but for music
- All Media Network – a commercial database launched by the Rovi Corporation that compiles information from the former services AllMovie and AllMusic
- Animator.ru
- Big Cartoon DataBase
- DBCult Film Institute
- Discogs
- Douban
- Filmweb
- FindAnyFilm
- Flickchart
- Goodreads
- Internet Adult Film Database
- Internet Movie Cars Database (IMCDb)
- Internet Movie Firearms Database (IMFDb)
- Internet Book Database (IBookDb)
- Internet Broadway Database (IBDb)
- Internet Off-Broadway Database (IOBDb)
- Internet Speculative Fiction Database (ISFDb)
- Internet Theatre Database (ITDb)
- Letterboxd
- List of films considered the best
- List of films considered the worst
- Metacritic
- Rotten Tomatoes
- TheTVDB
