= BFI Film & TV Database =

British online database of movie, television show and video game information

- Website type: Film archive
- Owner: British Film Institute
- Website: bfi.org.uk

The BFI Film & TV Database (ftvdb) is an online database created by the British Film Institute containing information related to cinema, television shows, actors, production crew personnel, video games and fictional characters featured in visual entertainment media, from the UK. It was previously featured on a BFI website under this name, but on 26 June 2014, every page was changed to redirect to listings on the BFI's main site.

"We are aware that some users are experiencing technical difficulties with Collections Search. We are working to resolve these issues and we are sorry for the inconvenience and frustration this may cause. For help with BFI National Archive moving image collections, please email the Archive Access team at ___ For help with scripts, documents and ephemera or stills, posters and designs, contact the Special Collections team For help with BFI Reuben Library collections, contact the Library team"

== See also ==
- AFI Catalog of Feature Films
- TCM Movie Database
- Complete Index to World Film
- Allmovie
- Early Cinema History Online
- European Audiovisual Observatory
- FindAnyFilm
- Internet Movie Cars Database
- Movie Review Query Engine
