= McLoone =

McLoone is a surname. Notable people with the surname include:

- Johnny McLoone (fl. 1996–2015), Gaelic footballer
- Leo McLoone (born 1989), Gaelic footballer
- Martin McLoone (1950–2023), Northern Ireland academic and writer
- Paul McLoone (born 1967), Irish musician
- Peter McLoone (born 1950), Irish trade union leader
