= MakoLab =

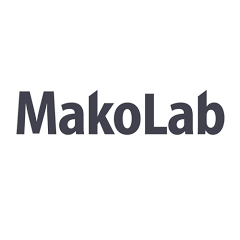

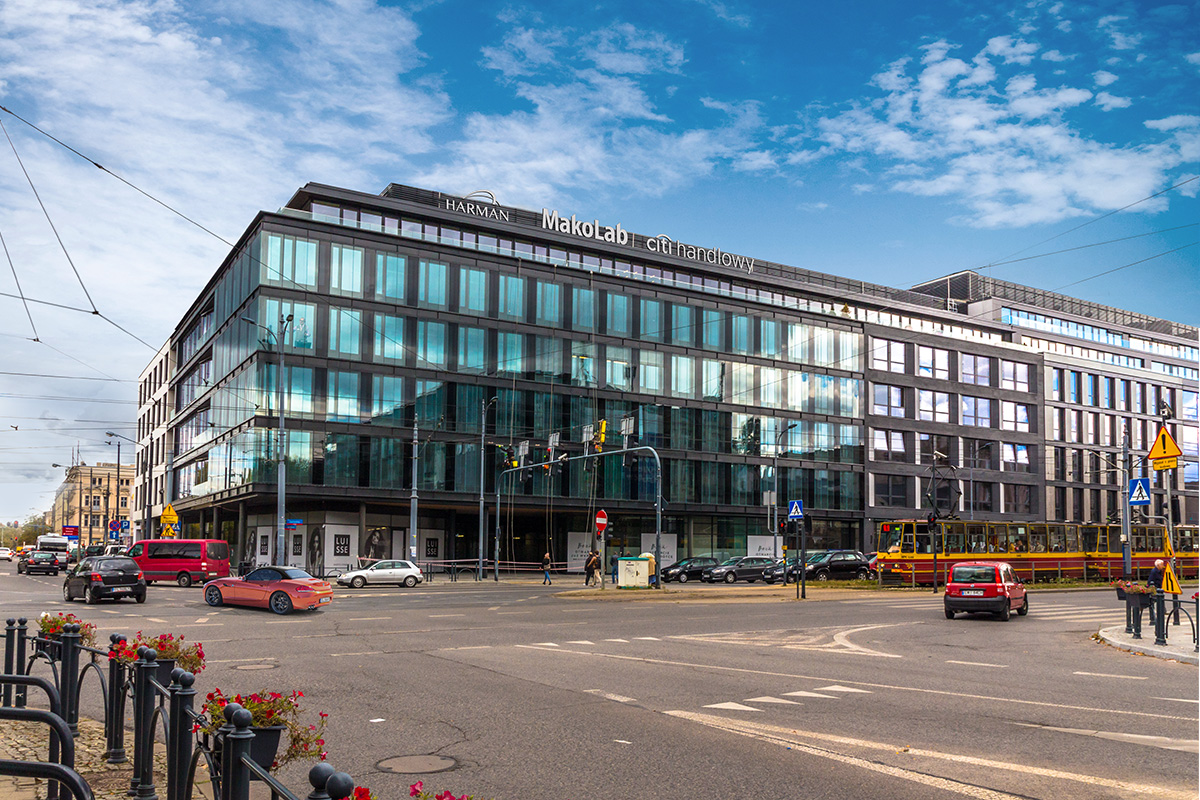
- MakoLab Office in Ogrodowa Street, Łódź
- Trade name: Makolab
- Native name: Makolab S.A
- Formerly: Mako Typesetting
- Company type: Private Limited Company Private
- Traded as: WSE NewConnect
- ISIN: PLMKLAB00023
- Industry: Computing
- Founded: 1989 in Łódź, Poland
- Founder: Mirek Sopek
- Headquarters: 8 Ogrodowa Street, Łódź, Poland
- Number of locations: 7 Offices - London, Paris, Munich, Warsaw, Lodz, Lublin, Tampa (FL) (2020)
- Area served: Worldwide
- Key people: Wojciech Zielinski - President of the Board Mirek Sopek - Vice-President of the Board
- Services: Information Technology
- Revenue: $11,4M (2019)
- Number of employees: 259 (2019)
- Subsidiaries: Makolab UK LTD. Makolab USA Inc; Makolab Deutschland GmbH
- Website: https://makolab.com

MakoLab is an international IT company with its headquarters in Łódź, Poland, specialised in business web software. Since 2007 MakoLab is listed on the Warsaw Stock Exchange. For some R&D projects Makolab works in collaboration with John Paul II University (KUL) in Lublin. The company has offices in Poland, Paris, London, Munich and Tampa (Florida).

Makolab has also been an contributor to the development of the web-based ontological dictionary Schema.org, focusing more specifically on automotive and financial ontologies and the EDM Council
