= Zsófia Tarján =

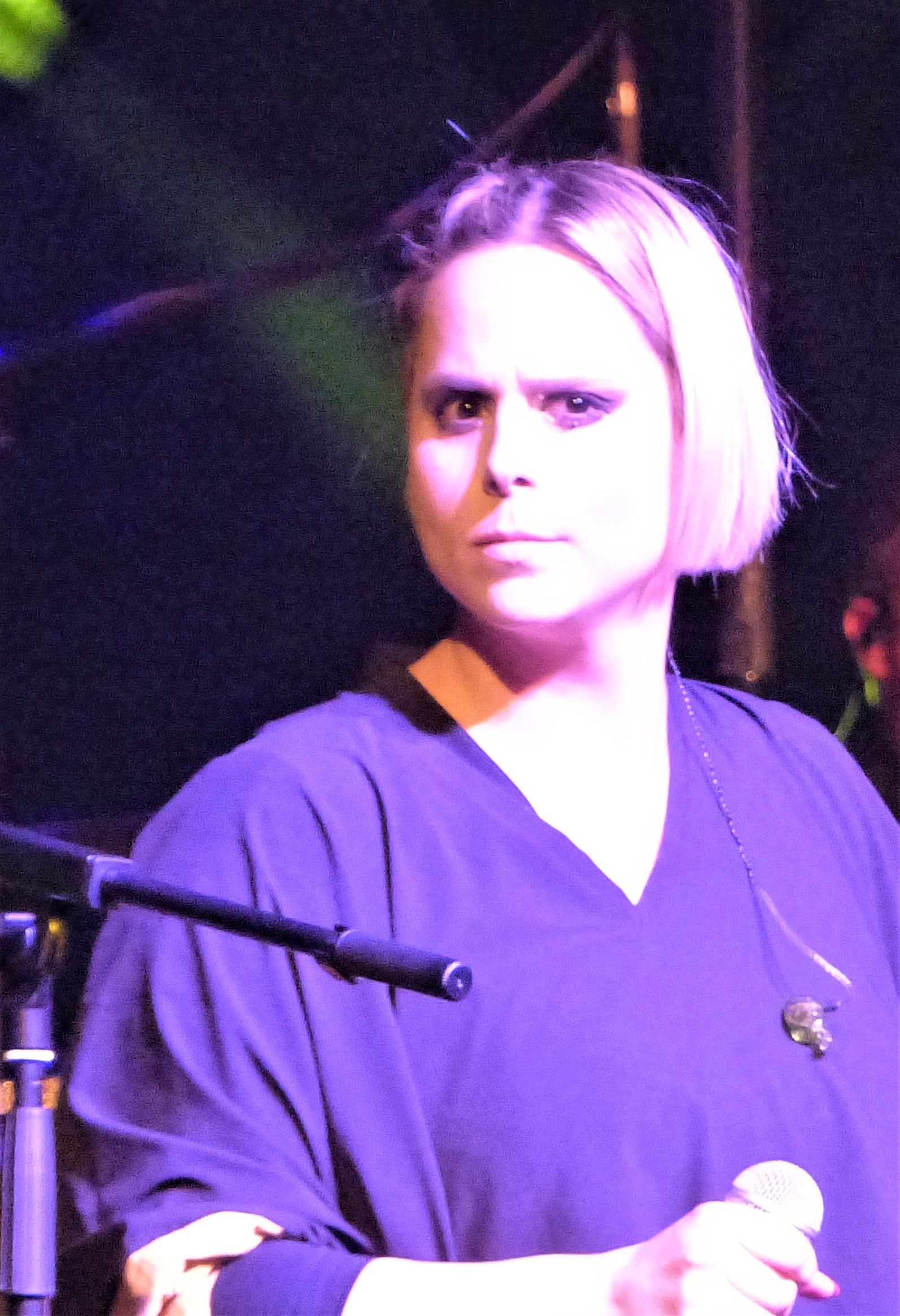

Background information
- Born: July 26, 1986 (age 39); Budapest, Hungary
- Genres: pop rock
- Years active: 2006-present
- Website: tarjanzsofia.blogspot.hu

Zsófia Rebeka Tarján (Budapest, July 26, 1986) is a Hungarian singer, graphic designer, and daughter of actress and singer Judit Hernádi.

== Career ==
Her father is Pál Tarján, opera singer. Her mother is Judit Hernádi, Jászai Mari Award–winning actress and meritorious artist.

In 2011, she became the frontperson of the Hungarian band Honeybeast, replacing Anett Czutor. She was previously a member of the metal band Cenobite (2006–2008) and Balkan Fanatik.

In 2010, she played Nóri in the play An Actress's Daughter at the Thália Theatre, playing alongside her mother.

In 2015, she appeared in the Viasat 6 show Sztár Gokart.

== Books ==
- Judit Hernádi – Zsófia Tarján: Don't let it stay between us, Open Books, Budapest (2021)

== Sources ==
- Tarján Zsófia: hörgős metáltól A legnagyobb hősig
- Tarján Zsófia at PORT.hu (in Hungarian)

== Additional Information ==
- Fánk történetek
- Hernádi Judit a kislányával
- Tarján Zsófia Rebeka - A legnagyobb hős YouTube (3:30)
