= The Soap Opera Encyclopedia =

The Soap Opera Encyclopedia may refer to:

- The Soap Opera Encyclopedia (Schemering book), a 1985 reference book by Christopher Schemering
- The Soap Opera Encyclopedia (Waggett book), a 1997 reference book by Gerard J. Waggett
