= Kevin Rockett =

Irish cinema historian

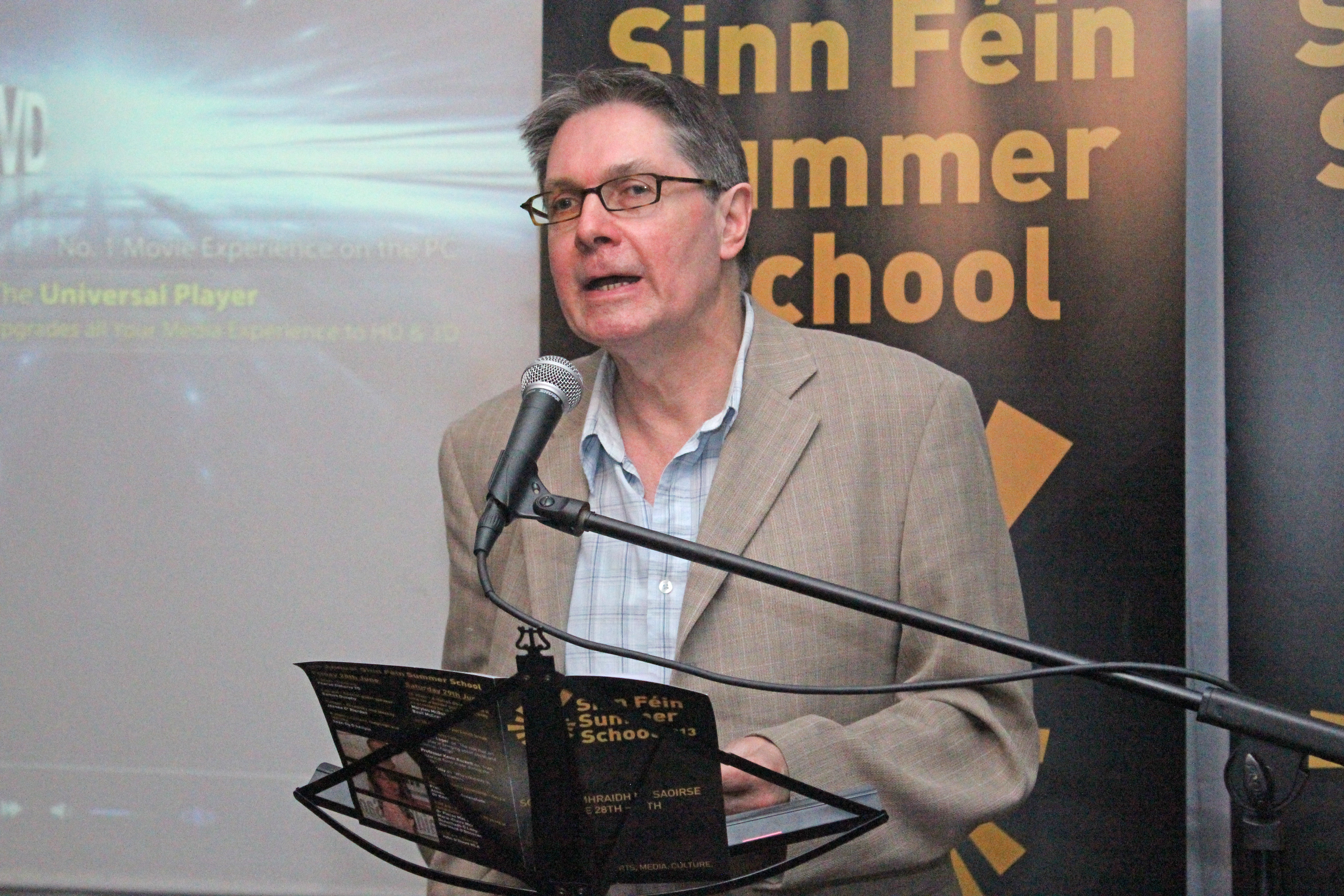
- Rockett in 2013
- Education: PhD; University of Ulster, 1989; M.A. (jure officii); Trinity College, 2004
- Alma mater: University of Ulster
- Occupations: Film historian, author, scholar
- Writing career
- Language: English
- Period: 1980–present
- Genre: Film history
- Subject: Irish film
- Notable works: – Cinema and Ireland: The Irish Filmography; Neil Jordan: Exploring Boundaries; Irish Film Censorship
- Notable awards: Irish Film Institute Award

Kevin Rockett is an Irish film historian, writer and scholar specializing in the history of Irish cinema. He is currently an associate professor in Film Studies and head of the School of Drama, Film and Music, at Trinity College, Dublin. He has authored, co-authored, or edited numerous books, including Cinema and Ireland (1987), The Irish Filmography (1996), Neil Jordan: Exploring Boundaries (2003) and Irish Film Censorship (2004).

== Background ==
Rockett became a member of the Irish Film Institute in 1979, and he served as the IFI's chairman from 1984 through 1991. He received his doctorate from the University of Ulster in 1989.

Rockett taught film studies at University College Dublin before joining the faculty at Trinity College in 2000. He was made a Fellow of the College in 2004, receiving his Master in Arts (jure officii).

In 1995, Rockett wrote the screenplay for the film Irish Cinema: Ourselves Alone?, directed by Donald Taylor Black.

=== Partial bibliography ===
- 1987, Cinema and Ireland. Kevin Rockett, Luke Gibbons, John Hill. ISBN 0-7099-4216-8
- 1995, Still Irish: A Century of the Irish in Film. Kevin Rockett, Eugene Finn. ISBN 1-900361-00-0
- 1996, The Companion to British and Irish Cinema. John Caughie, Kevin Rockett. ISBN 0-304-34158-4
- 1996, Cinema Companions Pack. John Caughie, Kevin Rockett. ISBN 0-304-70039-8
- 1996, The Irish Filmography: Fiction Films 1896–1996. Kevin Rockett. ISBN 0-913616-35-4
- 1999, Still Irish: A Century of the Irish in Film. ISBN 0-7881-6145-8
- 2002, Neil Jordan. Kevin Rockett. ISBN 1-86076-218-2
- 2003, Ten Years After: The Irish Film Board 1993–2003. Kevin Rockett, Bord Scannán na hÉireann. ISBN 0-9545157-0-6
- 2003, Neil Jordan: Exploring Boundaries. Emer Rockett, Kevin Rockett. ISBN 1-904148-28-X
- 2004, Irish Film Censorship: A Cultural Journey From Silent Cinema to Internet Oornography. Kevin Rockett, Emer Rockett. ISBN 1-85182-844-3
- 2004, National Cinema and Beyond. Kevin Rockett, John Hill. ISBN 1-85182-873-7
- 2005, Film History and National Cinema. W. John Hill, Kevin Rockett. ISBN 1-85182-924-5
- 2007, Irish Films, Global Cinema. Martin McLoone, Kevin Rockett. ISBN 1-84682-081-2
- 2008, National Cinemas and World Cinema. Kevin Rockett, W. John Hill. ISBN 1-84682-019-7

== Recognition ==
Jeff Brownrigg of Australia's National Film and Sound Archive wrote that the Irish Filmography(1996) is "an indispensable tool for the researcher," and that it "provides a valuable source of information about a large group of international narrative feature films gathered together under the head of their general association with Ireland." He commented on the book's nearly two thousand entries and made note of its comprehensive nature, concluding that it "is an essential reference for libraries and will be sought by film buffs."

Lir Mac Cárthaigh of Film Ireland wrote that Neil Jordan: Exploring Boundaries (2003) "provides a convenient starting-point for anyone intending to write about Jordan's work, the history of Irish film, or cinematic representations."

In 2001, Rockett received the Irish Film Institute Award for Contribution to Irish Film.
