= SoftBlue =

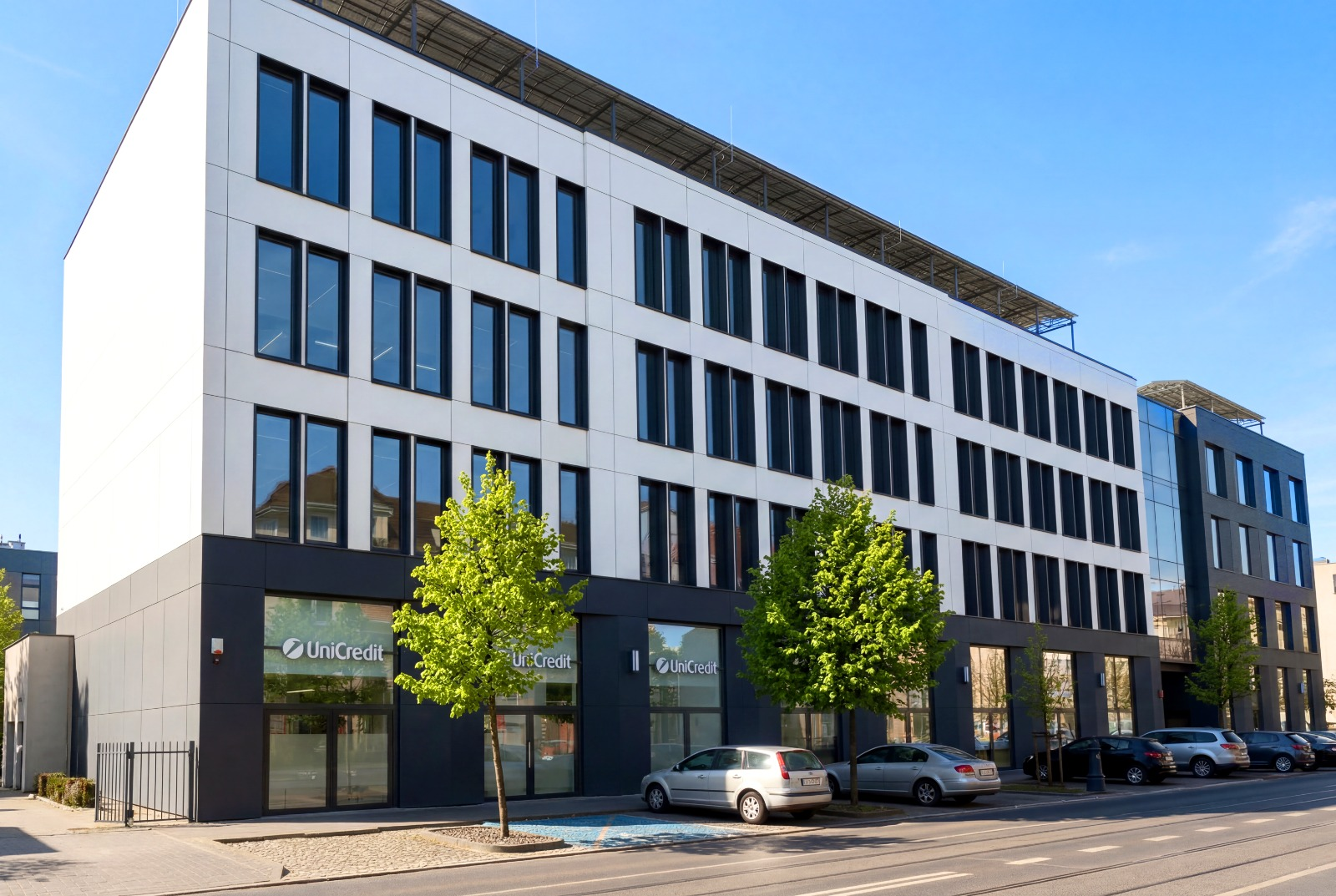
- company headquarters in Bydgoszcz
- Trade name: SoftBlue
- Native name: SoftBlue S.A.
- Traded as: WSE NewConnect
- ISIN: PLSFTBL00012
- Industry: Computing
- Founded: 2003 in Łódź, Bydgoszcz
- Headquarters: Bydgoszcz and Dallas, Poland, United States
- Key people: Michał Witold Kierul (CEO)
- Services: Information Technology
- Website: https://softblue.pl/

SoftBlue S.A. (InTechHouse) is a Polish technology company headquartered in Bydgoszcz and Dallas. It was founded in 2003 and has been listed on the Warsaw Stock Exchange’s NewConnect market since 2015. The company operates in the fields of information technology, electronics, and telecommunications, delivering projects for enterprises and public institutions in Poland and abroad. It holds the status of a research and development centre granted by the Ministry of Development and Technology.

== Activities ==
SoftBlue designs and implements technological systems, including:

- artificial intelligence and data analytics systems,
- embedded systems,
- electronics design and Internet of Things (IoT) devices,
- software development and systems integration,
- solutions supporting process automation,
- telecommunications technologies.

The company’s operations cover the full system development cycle – from research and development work, through design and prototyping, to implementation and maintenance. Its solutions are used in sectors such as:

- Health care,
- energy and water management,
- public administration.

== Structure and operational activities ==
SoftBlue S.A. conducts its business through specialised units and technology brands, including:

- InTechHouse – an engineering and research & development unit that designs electronic systems, embedded software, industrial data platforms, and artificial intelligence solutions for regulated sectors.
- easyCALL – a conversational AI solution that includes voicebots and customer service automation systems.
