= Stephen Herbert =

Stephen Herbert may refer to:

- Stephen Herbert (athlete)
- Stephen Herbert (historian)
- Steve Herbert, Australian politician
