= Stopklatka.pl =

Polish film website

STOPKLATKA
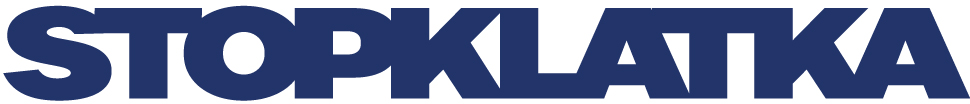
- Website type: The Internet database of films, TV series, actors and actresses
- Available in: Polish
- Owners: Stopklatka S.A., Kino Polska TV S.A.
- Creator: Adam Bortnik
- Website: stopklatka.pl
- Commercial: Yes
- Registration: Registration is optional for members to participate in discussions, comments, ratings and voting
- Launched: August 1, 1996; 30 years ago
- Current status: Active

Stopklatka.pl is the oldest Polish film website which provides information about films, television programmes, actors, actresses etc. The website was created in August 1996, however, the story of Stopklatka began as early as in October 1986, when the first radio programme was broadcast under the same title, "Stopklatka". In December 2012, the website went through significant changes such as logo and layout refreshments. Currently the database includes 60,169 films, 4,247 TV series (not mentioning episodes), and 191,950 actors and actresses.

== History ==
The founding of the site dates back to October 1986 when the first radio broadcast entitled Stopklatka (klatka is Polish for "[film] frame") appeared in Academic Radio Pomorze (Polish for Pomerania) in Szczecin. The creators of the broadcast included Daniel Bochiński and Mariusz Maślanka together with Adam Bortnik who joined them in 1987 and worked on the position of the President of the Board between 2000 and 2011. In 1993 the broadcast was relocated to the local radio "ABC" in Szczecin when its current editor-in-chief, Krzysztof Spór, joined the team.

In August 1996, Adam Bortnik created a website "Stopklatka" as a part of the Radio ABC web service. Content of the website was created by Krzysztof Spór. In autumn the same year Sławomir Cichoń became a member of the group and soon after that a web portal using a custom domain name was launched. On the basis of the legal contract signed with Microsoft Corporation, the portal became one of ten Polish news channels preinstalled in the Internet Explorer 4.0 browser.

In May 1998, Bortnik and Cichoń, each of whom contributed 50% of the company's capital, registered Stopklatka Partnership. Sławomir Cichoń resigned from the cooperation in 1999. At that point Przemysław Basiak, who cooperated with the company in earlier stages, entered into partnership. Przemysław Basiak's education in IT, experience in designing and building websites together with passion for films were a perfect complement to Adam Bortnik's and Krzysztof Spór's knowledge and film passion. Apart from the company's main activity which was portal's maintenance, Stopklatka Partnership started to provide service of designing, creating and maintaining websites for clients from the film industry.

In 2000 talks with a prospective investor from the industry, PROKOM Software S.A., resulted in the formation of Stopklatka LLC intended to continue the previous partnership's activity. The investor, PROKOM Internet S.A., one of holding companies of PROKOM Software S.A., later NET INTERNET S.A., received 80% of Stopklatka LLC's shares. Adam Bortnik and Przemysław Basiak became shareholders and members of the board of the newly created company. In the middle of 2009 Stopklatka LLC was transformed into a joint-stock company due to the plans of introducing its shares to be traded on the NewConnect market. On May 6, 2012 shareholders at the annual general meeting passed a resolution to issue B-series shares and apply for the introduction of company's shares to trading on NewConnect.

On May 31, 2010, as a result of selling a part of the shares by Net Internet S.A., the company gained a new strategic investor, Kino Polska TV LLC which in August, 2010, transformed into Kino Polska TV S.A. and became a member of the Media Group, SPI. On December 6, 2010, after the contract with Net Internet S.A. had been signed, Kino Polska TV S.A. became the majority shareholder (65.22%) of Stopklatka LLC. On July 12, 2010, the company made its debut on the alternative stock exchange, NewConnect, owned by Warsaw Stock Exchange. At that moment shares reached the price of 4,89 PLN, which was 20% higher than the issue price.

== TV licence ==
In the middle of 2014 the first film channel is going to be launched in Poland and will be included in digital terrestrial television (DTT). One of the candidates applying for the licence is Stopklatka TV acting on initiative of Kino Polska TV, Stopklatka.pl and the media partnership, Agora SA. Stopklatka TV aims to offer and broadcast feature films, documentaries, Polish and foreign animation films, educational and opinion journalism programmes. The project itself gained support of Polish film authorities e.g. Andrzej Wajda, Agnieszka Holland and Juliusz Machulski.

== Awards and highlights ==
- 2007 – partner of European Film Academy (People's Choice Award)
- 2008 – nominated for the award of Polish Institute of Film Art (PISF) in the category of Web portal
- 2009 – winner of PISF in the category of Web portal. PISF is awarded to people and institutions who give their significant contribution to the development, promotion and spread of film culture in Poland
- 2010 – nominated for PISF in the category of Web portal. The winner was Bazafilmowa.pl which is co-founded by Stopklatka.
- 2010 – Stopklatka.pl is declared to be the most interesting film website (second among culture websites) according to a questionnaire given to 11 Polish media journalists who work with the topic of culture daily (ranking published in the Press magazine, vol. 4/2010).
