= Internet Off-Broadway Database =

Online database of off-Broadway theatre productions

- Website type: Database: theatre and musical theatre
- Available in: English
- Owner: Lucille Lortel Foundation
- Website: www.spectra.theater/library
- Commercial: No
- Registration: No
- Launched: April 30, 2001
- Current status: Offline

The Internet Off-Broadway Database (IOBDB), also formerly known as the Lortel Archives, is an online database that catalogues theatre productions shown off-Broadway. As of March 2025, the database library is housed at the spectra.theater website.

The IOBDB was funded and developed by the non-profit Lucille Lortel Foundation, named in honor of actress and theatrical producer Lucille Lortel.

== See also ==
- Internet Movie Database (IMDb)
- Internet Theatre Database (ITDb)
- Internet Broadway Database (IBDb)
