= Flickchart =

Florida-based movie-ranking and social networking website

- Available in: English
- Creators: Jeremy Thompson, Nathan Chase
- Website: flickchart.com
- Registration: Required
- Launched: September 9, 2009
- Current status: Active

Flickchart is a Florida-based movie-ranking and social networking website.

== Description ==
Launched in September 2009, Flickchart is the brainchild of web programmer Jeremy Thompson and web designer Nathan Chase. The impetus behind the site's creation came from an argument over the placement of Pulp Fiction and The Empire Strikes Back on the Internet Movie Database Top 250. Thompson and Chase concluded that the limitations of movie rating systems using stars or numbers failed to produce accurate "Best Movie of All Time" lists. Flickchart was designed to remedy the issue by forcing users to decide between two random movies repeatedly until an accurate list is created, rather than rating each movie individually. This approach is intended to encourage users to seriously consider which film they actually prefer. Regarding the decision process, Thompson said, “Hopefully you’re reliving some of the scenes in your mind and you hate making a definitive pick".

== Critical reception ==
Reactions to the site from film bloggers and other observers have been generally positive. Barb Dybwad of Mashable describes the site's "game-like premise" as "rather addictive". Jeremy Smith (a.k.a. "Mr. Beaks") of Ain't It Cool News described himself as hooked after 15 minutes and obsessed after four hours, but stated "Is the process flawless? Hardly." He then explains that films of inferior quality can get stuck near the top of a person's rankings and be hard to dislodge through the random dueling process, because the film must have the right duels against superior films, in order to move downward to its proper place in the rankings. In a June 2009 article, Scott Weinberg of Cinematical called it "easily the coolest movie website of the year" and described himself as "tickled, fascinated, enamored and addicted". The site's addictive qualities have also been given a negative spin, at least humorously, by Cole Abaius at the blog Film School Rejects, in which he contended that Flickchart would "ruin your life." "Why will it ruin your life?" asked Abaius. "Because it’s going to take up all of your time, and all you’ll be doing is tearing your hair out and clicking".
