= Filmfront =

Norwegian online film database

- Website type: Online film and TV database
- Available in: Norwegian
- Website: Filmfront.no
- Commercial: Yes
- Registration: Optional
- Current status: Active

Filmfront is a Norwegian website for films and television series similar to Internet Movie Database. Filmfront also covers various news on movie and celebrity material from both within and outside Norway. It has information on over 28,000 films, 3,000 short films, 220,000 actors and 6,500 TV shows. A community website with the option for users to share their information in a profile, it is modeled after Facebook.

Filmfront is owned by Filmfront AS, a Norwegian company owned Pål Frostad and Omega Media AS.
