= Internet Broadway Database =

Database of theatre productions and personnel

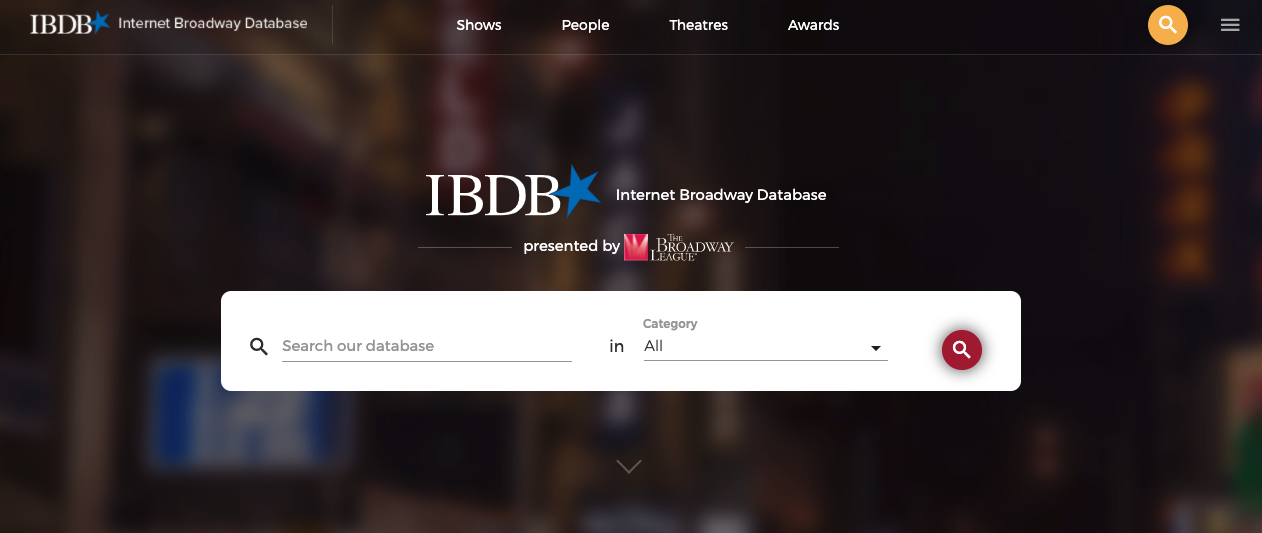
- Website type: Theatrical database
- Available in: English
- Owner: The Broadway League
- Website: ibdb.com
- Launched: November 20, 2000; 25 years ago
- Current status: Active

The Internet Broadway Database (IBDB) is an online database of Broadway theatre productions and their personnel. It was conceived and created by Karen Hauser in 1996 and is operated by the Research Department of The Broadway League, a trade association for the North American commercial theatre community.

== History ==
Karen Hauser, research director for the Broadway League, developed the Internet Broadway Database, which was launched in 1996 or 2001. Prior to that, she served as the League's media director. She has written on the economic health of Broadway and how it contributes to New York City's economy as well as that of the cities that touring productions visit. Hauser co-produced the 2000 production of Keith Reddin's The Perpetual Patient.

== Overview ==
This comprehensive history of Broadway provides records of productions from the beginnings of New York theatre in the 18th century up to today. Details include cast and creative lists for opening night and current day, song lists, awards and other interesting facts about every Broadway production. Other features of IBDB include an extensive archive of photos from past and present Broadway productions, headshots, links to cast recordings on iTunes or Amazon, gross and attendance information.

Its mission was to be an interactive, user-friendly, searchable database for League members, journalists, researchers, and Broadway fans.

The database includes Broadway Touring for ease of tracking shows that play in theatres across the country.

It is managed by Michael Abourizk of the Broadway League.

== See also ==
- Internet Movie Database (IMDb)
- Internet Theatre Database (ITDb)
- Internet Off-Broadway Database (IOBDb)
