= Internet Theatre Database =

- Website type: Theatrical database
- Available in: English
- Owner: Keith Scollick
- Creator: Keith Scollick
- Website: theatredb.com
- Registration: Optional
- Launched: May 1999; 27 years ago
- Current status: Inactive

The Internet Theatre Database (ITDb) was an online database with information about plays, playwrights, actors, legitimate theatre, musical theatre, Broadway shows, and similar theatrical information.

The website was run by several volunteer theatre aficionados, each contributing material as time permits. Somewhat similar to the Internet Broadway Database, the site's creators' endeavored to include theatre outside of New York City by indexing London and Off-Broadway productions, national tours, and regional theatre. Modelled on the considerably larger Internet Movie Database, the site indexed by six categories: (1) show/play name; (2) people (actor, writer, or director); (3) theatre facility; (4) song title; (5) character/role; and (6) production role. Each day, the site showed what well-known productions opened or closed on that date at important theatres in the past several decades.

As of July 2020, it had not been updated in over a decade.

Sometime after 23 May 2024 (the last archived date on the Wayback Machine), the account for the website's domain was suspended.

== See also ==
- Internet Movie Database (IMDb)
- Internet Broadway Database (IBDb)
- Internet Off-Broadway Database (IOBDb)
