= Korean War Filmography =

2003 non-fiction book

- Author: Robert J. Lentz
- Language: English
- Genre: Non-fiction
- Publisher: McFarland & Company
- Publication date: 2003

Korean War Filmography is a 2003 non-fiction book written by Robert J. Lentz. Published by McFarland & Company, the book focuses on the films based upon the Korean War.
