= Svensk mediedatabas =

National Library of Sweden database

- Website type: database
- Available in: Swedish
- Owner: National Library of Sweden
- Website: smdb.kb.se
- Registration: not required
- Launched: 2008

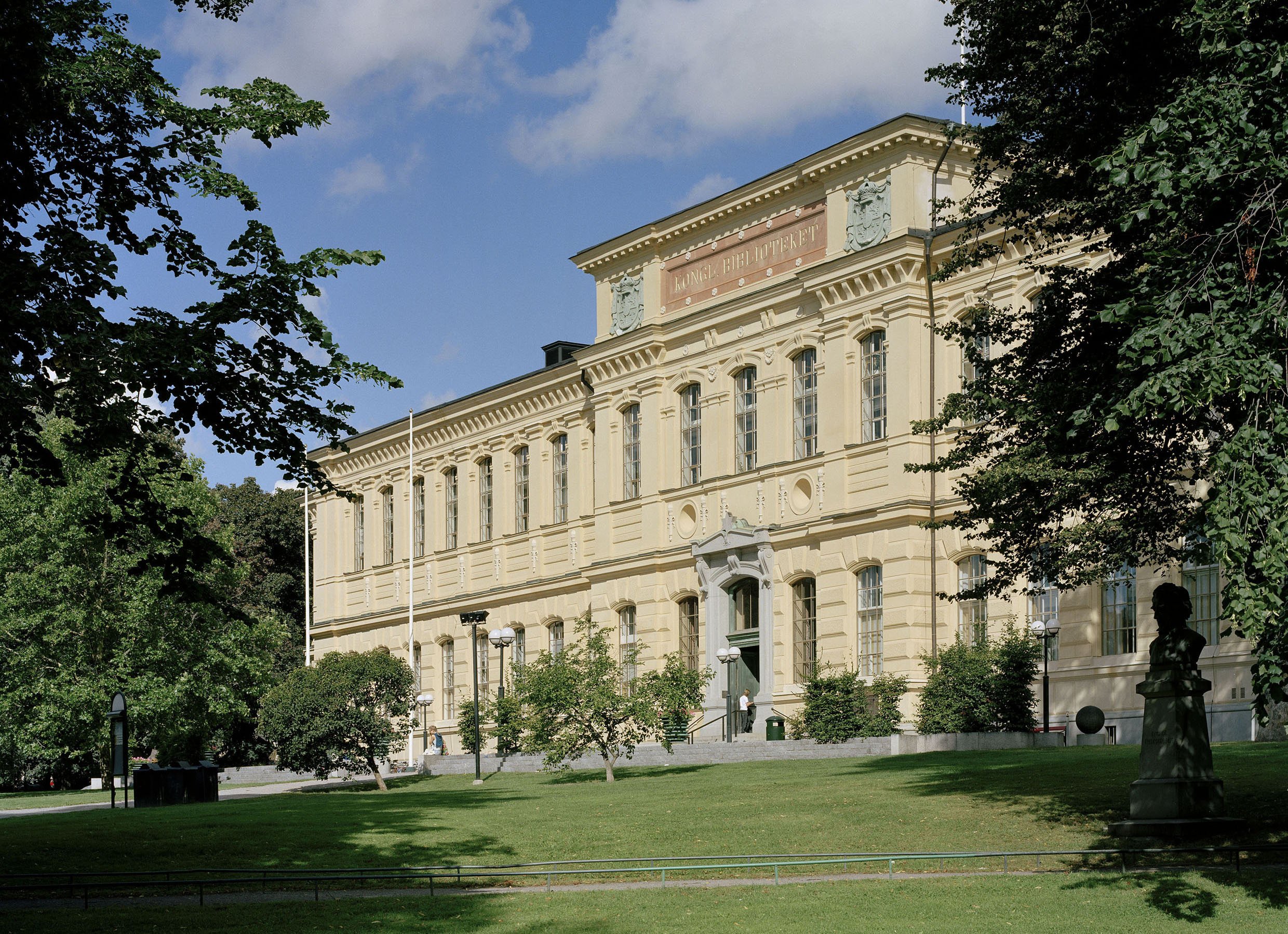
The National Library of Sweden.

Svensk mediedatabas (Swedish Media Database) is a search engine for the audiovisual works of the National Library of Sweden.

The database contains data about TV, radio, video, movies that have been shown in cinemas, gramophone records, CDs, cassette tapes, video games and multimedia. The SMDB contains most Swedish broadcasts and publications since 1979, but also older works. There is an almost complete list of Swedish gramophone records starting from the end of the 19th century. The SMDB also contains information about special collections such as older advertisement films and video recordings from Swedish theatres.

As of 2011, the database contains information about nearly eight million hours of audiovisual content.

== Database ==
The database contains information about the following, starting from 1979:

- TV and radio broadcasts by Sveriges Radio, Sveriges Television, Utbildningsradion and TV4
- TV shows that have been broadcast using Swedish digital terrestrial television or satellite broadcasts originating from Sweden
- A selection of some local TV and radio broadcasts
- Movies that have been shows in cinemas in Sweden
- Video that has been distributed in Sweden
- Swedish phonorecords, that is, published and unpublished sound recordings
- Swedish interactive multimedia with sound or motion pictures
