= WWE Encyclopedia =

2009 book

WWE Encyclopedia: The Definitive Guide to World Wrestling Entertainment
- Author: Brian Shields; Kevin Sullivan
- Illustrator: Doug Wilkins
- Cover artist: Eli Zigdon
- Language: English
- Series: World Wrestling Entertainment
- Subject: Professional wrestling
- Genre: Encyclopedia
- Publisher: Dorling Kindersley
- Publication date: 2009
- Publication place: United States
- English publication date: 2008
- Pages: 366 pages
- ISBN: 0-7566-4190-X
- OCLC: 244419109

The WWE Encyclopedia: The Definitive Guide to World Wrestling Entertainment is a reference book published by DK, featuring in-depth information surrounding the leading organization in professional wrestling, World Wrestling Entertainment (WWE), released in 2009.

The book covers the 45-year history of WWE and features a comprehensive A-Z listing of nearly 1,000 former and current wrestlers from as early as the 1960s to the present day. The book also contains official listings for title histories, television and pay-per-view events, most notably, a detailed history of WrestleMania.

Second, third, and fourth editions of the book, each featuring updated entries, were released in 2012, 2016, and 2020 respectively.

== Synopsis ==
The WWE Encyclopedia: The Definitive Guide to World Wrestling Entertainment contains profiles for past and present WWE personalities, as well as event and title histories. While providing information primarily about the personalities career in WWE, information is also present about their careers in other companies. People who portrayed separate characters are often given separate profiles for each character.

People who left the company on bad terms were given favorable profiles, including Alundra Blayze and Ultimate Warrior. Chris Benoit's profile appears in all four editions of the encyclopedia, despite the 2007 double murder of his wife and son and suicide.

== Writing ==
Brian Shields and Kevin Sullivan (not the wrestler) created the book together. WWE was given final say over who would be included in the book. Overall, the book took over one year to create. Sullivan and Shields divided some of the work load, dividing the research for championship title histories in half.

== Reception ==
The book debuted at No. 10 on The New York Times Hardcover Books Bestsellers List and climbed as high as No. 8.

It received mostly favorable reviews. Bob Kapur of SLAM! Wrestling was favorable toward the book, saying that it "is just the ticket for fans looking for a trip down memory lane". He praised the book for including lesser known personalities, but also criticized the absence of notable tag teams such as Doug Furnas and Phil LaFon.
