= Stephen Herbert (historian) =

British visual media historian

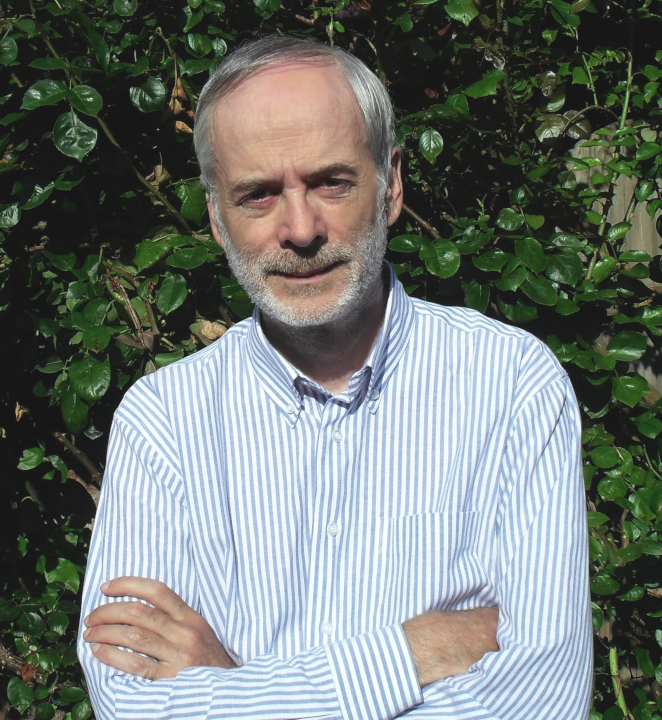
- Herbert in 2010
- Born: 1951
- Died: 3 September 2023 (aged 71–72)
- Occupation: Visual media historian

Stephen Herbert (1951–2023) was a British visual media historian, author, editor, publisher and projectionist. He was head of technical services at the BFI Southbank and the Museum of the Moving Image.

== Career ==
Herbert was a projectionist at various London cinemas from 1969 to 1973, before spending sixteen years as a technician in audio-visual education. He joined the British Film Institute's National Film Theatre in 1989, first as deputy then as head of Technical Department. This included responsibility for projection at the London Film Festival and the Museum of the Moving Image. He was also a development team member for the BFI IMAX from 1995 to 1997.

In the mid-1990s, Herbert set up a small publishing business, The Projection Box, with partner Mo Heard. They published books and booklets on early film and media history, including titles written by Herbert himself, notably a biography of Edwardian visual media pioneer Theodore Brown (1997) and Industry, Liberty and a Vision (1998), on inventor and political theorist Wordsworth Donisthorpe. As an editor he compiled a trio of three-volume sets on pre-cinema, early film and early television for Routledge, and co-edited Magic Images, Servants of Light and The Encyclopaedia of the Magic Lantern, all published by the Magic Lantern Society, for whom he was research officer 1988–2000. He produced a number of websites, including Who's Who of Victorian Cinema (based on the 1996 book co-edited with Luke McKernan), The Compleat Muybridge and The Optilogue.

He was a consultant on the development of moving image museums in Dubai and Qatar, and was a visiting research fellow at Kingston University, home to the Eadweard Muybridge archive. He was a board member of the Bill Douglas Centre for the History of Cinema and Popular Culture, University of Exeter, 1997–2000. He was a technical consultant on two feature films, Merchant-Ivory's The Golden Bowl (2000) and Martin Scorsese's Hugo (2011). Many items from Stephen Herbert's collection, including artefacts and research papers, were donated to The Bill Douglas Cinema Museum at the University of Exeter and can be accessed for research. Similarly, a collection of more than 500 items including books, research papers, and original artefacts connected to the early history of motion pictures were donated to Leeds Beckett University where they became the foundation for the university’s Early Cinema Research Group. These, too, can be accessed by researchers.

== Selected bibliography ==
- The Adventures of Popeye: The Popeye Book Volume 1 (London: Stephen Herbert, 1979)
- Magic Images: The Art of Hand-Painted & Photographic Lantern Slides (Magic Lantern Society, 1990) (co-edited with Dennis Crompton and David Henry)
- When the Movies Began... A Chronology of the World's Film Productions and Film Shows Before May, 1896 (London: The Projection Box, 1994)
- Who's Who of Victorian Cinema: A Worldwide Survey (London: British Film Institute, 1996) (co-edited with Luke McKernan)
- Servants of Light: The Book of the Lantern (Magic Lantern Society, 1997) (co-edited with Dennis Crompton and Richard Franklin)
- Theodore Brown's Magic Pictures: The Art and Inventions of a Multi-Media Pioneer (London: The Projection Box, 1997)
- Industry, Liberty, and a Vision: Wordsworth Donisthorpe's Kinesigraph (Hastings: The Projection Box, 1998, second edition 2017)
- A History of Pre-Cinema (London/New York: Routledge: 2000, three volumes) (editor)
- A History of Early Film (London/New York: Routledge: 2000, three volumes) (editor)
- The Encyclopaedia of the Magic Lantern (London: The Magic Lantern Society, 2001) (co-edited with David Robinson and Richard Crangle)
- A History of Early Television (London/New York: Routledge, 2004, three volumes) (editor)
- Eadweard Muybridge: The Kingston Museum Bequest (Hastings: The Projection Box, 2004) (editor)
- The Dickens Daguerreotype Portraits (Hastings: The Projection Box, 2011 and 2012)
- Eadweard Muybridge: Muy Blog Selection 2009-2012 (Hastings: The Projection Box, 2014)

== Websites ==
Most of Herbert's websites are no longer available on the open web but can be accessed via the Internet Archive. His sites have also been preserved on the UK Web Archive.

- Stephen Herbert (archived site)
- The Compleat Muybridge (archived site)
- MOMI (archived site)
- Muy Blog (archived site)
- NeverSeen Books & Curios (archived site)
- The Optilogue
- The Projection Box (archived site)
- The Race to Cinema
- The Wheel of Life (archived site)
- Who's Who of Victorian Cinema
- YouTube channel
- https://www.bdcmuseum.org.uk/news/the-stephen-herbert-award-2025/]
- https://www.leedsbeckett.ac.uk/research/larc/early-cinema-research-group/
