= DBCult Film Institute =

- Logo of DBCult Film Institute
- Abbreviation: DBCult
- Formation: 2011
- Type: Film institute, Online multi-database for cult movies
- Headquarters: Palermo, Italy
- Official language: English, Italian, Spanish, French, German
- Website: Official website

The DBCult Film Institute is an independent non-profit organization and film foundation created by film and cultural operators. The organization describes itself as "institute of cinematic memory", which aims to collect, preserve films from decay and to transmit future film productions on to cult film and genre cinema.

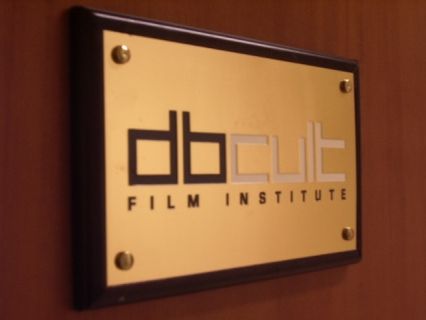
Nameplated DBCult Film Institute

The Film Institute is located in Palermo, Italy, and operates under cult cinema in order to preserve films, related materials in the most advanced manner possible, protect films from deterioration and neglect while also preserving their cultural aspect and future deliverance.

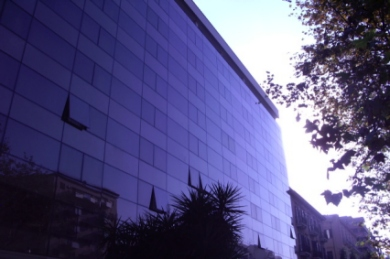
DBCult Film Institute Head Office in Italy

Cult cinema has very specific connotations which defines it. In the Anglosphere they are called cult films and surface b-movies, in Italy they are called cinema di genere (genre films), cinema bis in France, cine de culto in Spain and South America, filmes do gênero in Portugal and Brazil, filme des genres in Germany etc., but more specifically, characterizing these films with one or more genres since the birth of cinema with the Lumière brothers to the 1980s, usually far from the lavish productions. Often playing a key role in their bibliography, home video production and the general trend expressed by millions of media people around the world.

The foundation is managed by goal oriented film scholars, writers and people who work within the film industry. The film library offers all its cinema operators and associates an extensive archive of film database information, publications and press articles. The study and the interest of the organization is focused primarily on genre film productions, especially Horror film, Science Fiction film, Action film, Adventure film, Comedy film, Crime film, Mondo film, Drama film, Fantasy film, Mystery film, Noir film, Peplum or Sword-and-sandal film, Sexy, Spy film, Thriller film, War film, Western film, and related subgenres.

== History ==
The DBCult Film Institute was founded in 2011, replacing the BCult Associazione Culturale, founded in 2003. The organization results from the integration between the old BCult A.C. and their new film and cultural collaborators. In 2019 the cultural association, after enlarging its no-profit mission and getting numerous donations of cinematographic materials, change its name becoming ASCinema - Archivio Siciliano del Cinema.

== Activities ==
The DBCult Film Institute is active within seven main areas which are subsidized:

- Restoration and preservation of all films produced before the 1990s.
- Preservation of related material (posters, publications, photos, printed media, soundtracks, etc.)
- Communication of cult movies culture.
- Archives, museum activities.
- Regular public meetings for the use of film festivals and exhibitions.
- Education, offering a range of education initiatives, in particular to support the teaching of film and media studies in schools.
- Maintenance of the Movie Db, Publication Db and Printed Media Db (summaries of information on movies and related artists), a multi-database which contains credits, synopses and other data on global cult film.

== Archive ==
- Film

The institute stock consists of approximately 62.000 movies on different formats of film and video. For the last 40 years these films have come together from either private collectors and/or other foundations. In particular there are some very important collections of Italian, French, British, Spanish, German, Swedish, American, Mexican and Japanese Cinema, among several other productions from many other countries.

- Publication

It keeps about 19.605 books, magazines, comic books, photonovels, fanzines etc. All of which consist of cult movie topics and we also have a rough calculation that includes about 2.207.012 photographs and press cuttings.

- Graphics Stock

Is assembled by a wealth of images on film promotion: some 1.9540.909 documents from posters, lobby cards, pictures and pressbooks.

- Music Stock

Our music stock is devoted to a collection of 6.048 vinyl records and CDs of movie soundtracks.
