= Moviemistakes.com =

Website noting mistakes in media

Movie Mistakes
- Website type: Online database for movies and television
- Available in: English
- Owner: Jon Sandys
- Website: www.moviemistakes.com
- Launched: September 4, 1996; 30 years ago
- Current status: Active

Moviemistakes.com is a website that notes mistakes and continuity errors found in film and television projects, with some books and games, and supplementary material covering trivia, quotes, DVD Easter eggs and movie trailers. It was created by Jon Sandys in September 1996. The site categorises mistakes into nine different areas: continuity, factual errors, mistakes that reveal the film-making process, visible crew or equipment, plot holes, audio problems, deliberate "mistakes", character mistakes, and "other".

As of 29 January 2021 the site listed over 160,000 mistakes and 20,000 items of trivia from more than 13,000 titles.

== History ==
Sandys initially became interested in movie errors after noting mistakes in Jurassic Park and True Lies while attending the Royal Grammar School. He began the Movie Mistakes website in 1996 as a single page with a few listings and an email address. Following his move to Southampton University, he operated the site from the university's server. In 1998, a Times article on movie mistakes mentioned the site, leading to an increase in traffic. In 1999 the site outgrew the university servers and moved to a dedicated server, along with promotion and advertising to finance operations.

On April 9, 2001, the site again grew in popularity following a Daily Mirror article on mistakes in the film Gladiator. On the same day, Sandys was invited to appear on the UK morning show The Big Breakfast to discuss movie mistakes, which became a weekly feature on the show until its cancellation. This exposure led to further interest in the website, the increased traffic leading to a temporary shutdown while the systems were upgraded. With these developments, Sandys began to work on the site on a full-time basis.

By 2003 the site was averaging 26,000 hits a day and a then-record 100,000 hits in December 2003 when an article on mistakes in The Lord of the Rings: The Return of the King was posted on Slashdot, crashing the site server. A server upgrade was prompted in January 2005 when a list of the "Top Mistakes of 2004" was copied by several publications and the site received a record 150,000 hits, again crashing the site.

The site has been referenced in interviews with film-makers, including Peter Jackson and Gore Verbinski.

In 2003 the site began to sell annual memberships with premium features. Content has expanded to include various lists of mistakes, along with pictures, videos, and a section for questions. It was listed as one of PC Magazine's Best Web Sites for Movie Fans in 2008. The site currently receives around 15,000 unique visitors per day.
