= Ciné-Ressources =

Ciné-Ressources is a union catalogue of the libraries and archives of French cinema, created on 22 August 2007 and managed by the Cinémathèque française.

Initiated by the Bibliothèque du film in collaboration with the Cinémathèque de Toulouse, it provides access to more than 200,000 resources through a web search engine.
