= The Irish Filmography =

The Irish Filmography 1896-1996
- Author: Kevin Rockett
- Cover artist: Mark Kausler
- Language: English
- Subject: Cinema
- Publisher: Red Mountain Media
- Publication date: 1996
- Publication place: Ireland
- Pages: 757
- ISBN: 0-913616-35-4

The Irish Filmography: Fiction Films 1896-1996 is a 757-page reference catalog of movies and short films produced from 1896 to 1996 in Ireland, or about Ireland and the Irish. It was published in 1996 by Red Mountain Press, a company in Dublin, Ireland. The chief editor was Kevin Rockett.

The catalog has a title index of approximately 2,000 films. Approximately one-tenth of those are Irish productions. The remainder, produced outside Ireland, are films about Ireland and the Irish diaspora. About one-half of the titles are American films; another quarter are Australian and British films. There are also films from Belgium, Canada, France, Germany, the Netherlands, Israel, Italy, Russia, and Spain.

== Arrangement of information ==
Films are grouped by country of origin, then by chronology within each nationality. Many entries have extensive detail including production credits, actors with role names, narrative synopsis, production and distribution companies, running time, color process, sound system, literary source and review citations.

=== Inclusion criteria ===
For non-Irish productions, the reason for inclusion is usually obvious, such as a setting in Ireland or a story about people of Irish heritage. Films set in other countries also qualify if shot in Ireland. Even one Irish character in a film's story qualifies that film for inclusion, such as Brigid O’Shaughnessy (played by Mary Astor) in The Maltese Falcon (1941).

All films about John F. Kennedy are included, even those in which that historical character doesn't appear; for example, the book has a detailed entry for Executive Action, a fictional story about a conspiracy to assassinate Kennedy.

Back to the Future (1985) has a detailed entry, owing to a scene in the Diner at the beginning when local bully Biff Tannan refers to Marty's father as 'Irish' in a derogatory fashion. Popeye Doyle (played by Gene Hackman) in The French Connection likewise qualifies as an Irish character; in the movie Doyle remarks 'kiss my Irish ass!' after he has got drunk on whiskey with a friendly French waiter.

=== Additional indexes ===
In addition to the index of film titles, the book also has the following indexes:

- Personal Names
- Corporate Names
- Composers and Songwriters
- Literary and Dramatic Sources

== Reception ==
Filmmaker Bob Quinn stated the book is "an extraordinary opus ... Rockett is an excellent and painstaking scholar. Never before has anybody attempted to document in one volume every film ever made in or about Ireland. ... The amount of detail he has unearthed is no less than stupendous. ... The nearest literary analogy I can think of is Dineen's Irish Dictionary", Jeff Brownrigg of Australia's National Film and Sound Archive writes that the book is "an indispensable tool for the researcher." and that it "provides a valuable source of information about a large group of international narrative feature films gathered together under the head of their general association with Ireland." He writes of the book's nearly two thousand entries and makes note of its comprehensive nature, concluding that it "is clearly an essential reference for libraries and will be sought by film buffs." Trinity College Dublin notes that the impetus for the creation of 'Irish Film & TV Research Online Film & Television Index' was Kevin Rockett's The Irish Filmography: Fiction Films 1896 - 1996, due to its documenting "all fiction films made in Ireland and about Ireland and the Irish produced worldwide since the beginnings of cinema". In Postcolonial and Gender Perspectives in Irish Studies, author Marisol Morales Ladrón writes that The Irish Filmography is a "wide-ranging directory", and notes that it contains information even on titles which have been lost. In Projecting ethnicity and race: an annotated bibliography of studies on imagery in American film, it is offered that "The sheer bulk of the 757 page, telephone book-sized work suggests the comprehensive breadth and detail offered..."
