= Who's Who of Victorian Cinema =

Who's Who of Victorian Cinema is a reference work on film pioneers by Stephen Herbert and Luke McKernan, British scholars of film history. Originally published by the British Film Institute in 1996 as a reference book, the content has been revised, updated and made available online. The site has biographies of more than 300 pioneers in the film industry, both directors and others who worked behind the cameras. It covers the period from 1871 to 1901, when films rapidly developed as a new way for people to see their worlds.

At the end of 2020 the site announced that it would no longer be updated, though it will continue remain online as a reference source.
