= Internet Movie Firearms Database =

Online database of firearm appearances in films

- Website type: Wiki
- Available in: English
- Owners: imfdb, LLC
- Editor: MelDez.MV
- Website: imfdb.org
- Commercial: No
- Registration: Optional (required for editing)
- Users: 14,895
- Launched: 10 May 2007; 19 years ago
- Current status: Active
- Content license: GNU Free Documentation License

The Internet Movie Firearms Database (IMFDb) is an online database of firearms used or featured in films, television shows, video games, and anime. A wiki running the MediaWiki software, it is similar in function (although unaffiliated) to the Internet Movie Database for the entertainment industry. It includes articles relating to actors, and some characters, such as James Bond, listing the particular firearms they have been associated with in their movies. Integrated into the website is an image hosting section similar to Wikimedia Commons that includes firearm photos, manufacturer logos, screenshots and related art. The site has been cited in magazines such as the NRA's American Rifleman and True West Magazine and magazine format television shows such as Shooting USA on the Outdoor Channel.

== History ==
Launched in May 2007 by "Bunni", The Internet Movie Firearm Database (IMFDb) was originally set up to help identify the use of firearms in Hollywood films. For the first few months of its existence, it listed only a dozen films including The Matrix, Platoon and Pulp Fiction. As the site grew, so did its content. In June 2007, the site began to list television shows as well as films. The site has since been expanded to include pages for video games and anime.

As of September 2024, the data base had grown to list over 7,260 films, over 2,422 television shows, over 920 video games and 578 Anime films and series.

The site has been used as a reference source by the owners of several shooting ranges located in Las Vegas, Nevada. After hearing customers ask to rent certain types of firearms used in movies and video games, the owners of the range used IMFDb to research the weapons in question.

== Prohibitions ==
=== Exclusions ===
One particular category of arms that is not intended to be a part of the database is fictional firearms. For example, weapons that are beyond current technology such as laser (as the projectile), plasma, and/or nuclear particle (i.e. photon, etc.) devices are typically not accepted by the contributors of the site. Often this category of fictional weapons is associated with video games and anime, but some movies (science fiction in particular) contain these as well. In these instances, the devices that represent actual firearms or hypothetical future evolution of current firearms are represented.

As the database primarily relates to small arms, categories of large destructive devices are excluded as well. One such example would be an Intercontinental Ballistic Missile (ICBM).

No homemade films are permitted.

=== Exceptions ===
Exceptions to the exclusions above are small arms that are fictional but constructed from real-life firearms (modified or original), even if the projectile is completely fictional. An example would be the blaster rifles from the Star Wars movies. These devices fire "bolts of energy" in the movies, and the firearm they are based on is the British-made Sterling sub-machine gun. Another example would be the 1999 movie Wild Wild West, in which a powered (as in, automatically revolving) Gatling gun is used, even though this was not realized until 1946—Gatling guns in the era in which the film is set were exclusively operated by hand crank.

== See also ==
- Stembridge Gun Rentals – the primary arsenal to Hollywood from the 1920s through 2007
- Internet Movie Cars Database – a website of similar concept for motor vehicles
