= Martin McLoone =

Northern Ireland academic and writer (1950–2023)

Martin McLoone (12 July 1950 – 3 October 2023) was an Irish academic and author. He was professor of media studies at the University of Ulster from 2006 until his retirement in 2014. He specialised in the history of Irish film and television, and authored four books and numerous articles about Irish media and culture.

== Early life and career ==
Martin McLoone was born in Derry, the third of nine children of John and Gretta, and grew up in the city’s Creggan Estate. He attended St Columb’s College in Derry, and from there went to University College Dublin, taking a degree in English and history. Moving to England in the mid-1970s, he taught English and the emerging subject of media studies at Holloway School (now Beacon High) in north London; then in 1980, went back to Dublin to become the Irish Film Institute's first education officer. In 1986 he returned to Northern Ireland to be part of the newly-established media studies department at the University of Ulster at Coleraine, subsequently becoming a professor and head of the university’s Centre for Media Research. He retired in 2014.

In 1987 he helped establish the Foyle Film Festival and was on the board of Derry’s Nerve Centre.

== Academic work ==
McLoone was seen as ‘a pioneer in the study of film and television in Ireland’. While working at the Irish Film Institute he established regular summer schools at Clongowes Wood College, aimed at promoting film and media education along the lines of similar initiatives by the BFI in Great Britain, and organised joint RTÉ/IFI television studies events out of which sprang the 1984 publication Television and Irish Society: 21 years of RTE (1984), which he co-edited.

After moving to Ulster University’s Coleraine campus in 1986, he continued to proselytise for media education and the study of Irish film and television, inspiring generations of students, some of whom followed him on similar paths into academia. He published further books: Irish Film (2000), which ‘remains a core text’ according to his former colleague John Hill; Film, Media and Popular Culture in Ireland (2008) and Cinema in Ireland, Scotland and Wales (also 2008). The book he co-authored with Noel McLaughlin, Rock and Popular Music in Ireland (2012) inspired a BBC documentary The Irish Rock Story: A Tale of Two Cities (2015).

In the introduction to his essay collection Film, Media and Popular Culture in Ireland (2008) McLoone attributed the then new confidence in 'Irishness' and the growth in the study of the Irish diaspora in large part to the Celtic Tiger phenomenon; much of the book was devoted to examining how these changes were reflected in the Irish films, television and music of the time.

== Personal life ==
He was married to Cindy Milner, a Canadian whom he met when she was an art student in Dublin; from the 1980s they lived in Portstewart, County Londonderry. They had three daughters, Katie, Maeve and Grainne; under the name Grainne Milner-McLoone the latter is a folk singer and researcher, who has recorded as Grainne Eve. He was the cousin of singer and broadcaster Paul McLoone.

Politically, he described himself as a ‘left-wing social democrat’; in his teens he was a canvasser for Eamonn McCann, and in Dublin in the 1980s a member of Jim Kemmy’s Democratic Socialist Party. He was a supporter of Tottenham Hotspur ever since his days in London and in later years a Spurs season-ticket holder

He died on 3 October 2023 of respiratory failure, having been diagnosed with Fibrotic Hypersensitivity Pneumonitis three years previously.

== Publications ==
=== Books ===
- Irish film: the emergence of a contemporary cinema. London: BFI, 2000. ISBN 978-0-85170-793-8
- Cinema in Ireland, Scotland and Wales. Edinburgh University Press, 2008
- Film, Media and Popular Culture in Ireland: Cityscapes, Landscapes, Soundscapes. Dublin: Irish Academic Press, 2008. ISBN 978-0-7165-2936-1
- (with Noel McLaughlin) Rock and Popular Music in Ireland: Before and After U2. Dublin: Irish Academic Press, 2012. ISBN 97807165307701
- (edited, with John McMahon) Television and Irish Society: 25 Years of RTE. Dublin: RTE, 1984
- (edited, with John Hill and Paul Hainsworth) Border Crossing: Film in Ireland, Britain and Europe. London: BFI, 1994
- (edited) Broadcasting in a Divided Community: Seventy Years of the BBC in Northern Ireland. Belfast: Institute of Irish Studies, 1996
- (edited, with Kevin Rockett) Irish Films, Global Cinema. Dublin: Four Courts Press, 2007 ISBN 978-1-84682-081-6

=== Selected papers ===
- The Abused Child of History: Neil Jordan's "The Butcher Boy", Cinéaste, Vol. 23, No. 4 (1998)
- Music hall dope and British propaganda? Cultural identity and early broadcasting in Ireland, Historical Journal of Film, Radio and Television, 2000
- Challenging Colonial Traditions: British Cinema in the Celtic Fringe. Cinéaste, Vol. 26, No. 4 (2001)
- Topographies of Terror and Taste: The Changing Face of Cinematic Belfast, in Keeping it Real: Irish Film and Television, eds Ruth Barton and Havey O’Brien, Wallflower Press, 2004
- Settling Old Scores? Religion, Secularisation and Irish Cinema, in Multiculturalism at the Start of the 21st Century, eds K. Kujawinska Courtney and M.A. Kukowska. Lodz University Press, 2007
- Why didn't Kevin Keegan play for Ireland? Contrasting narratives of the Irish in Britain. Irish Studies Review, 2011 https://pure.ulster.ac.uk/en/publications/why-didnt-kevin-keegan-play-for-ireland-contrasting-narratives-of-3/
- Cinema, city, and imaginative space: 'Hip hedonism' and recent Irish cinema, Genre and Cinema, 2012.
