= Early Cinema History Online =

Database of 35,000 films released U.S. 1908–1920

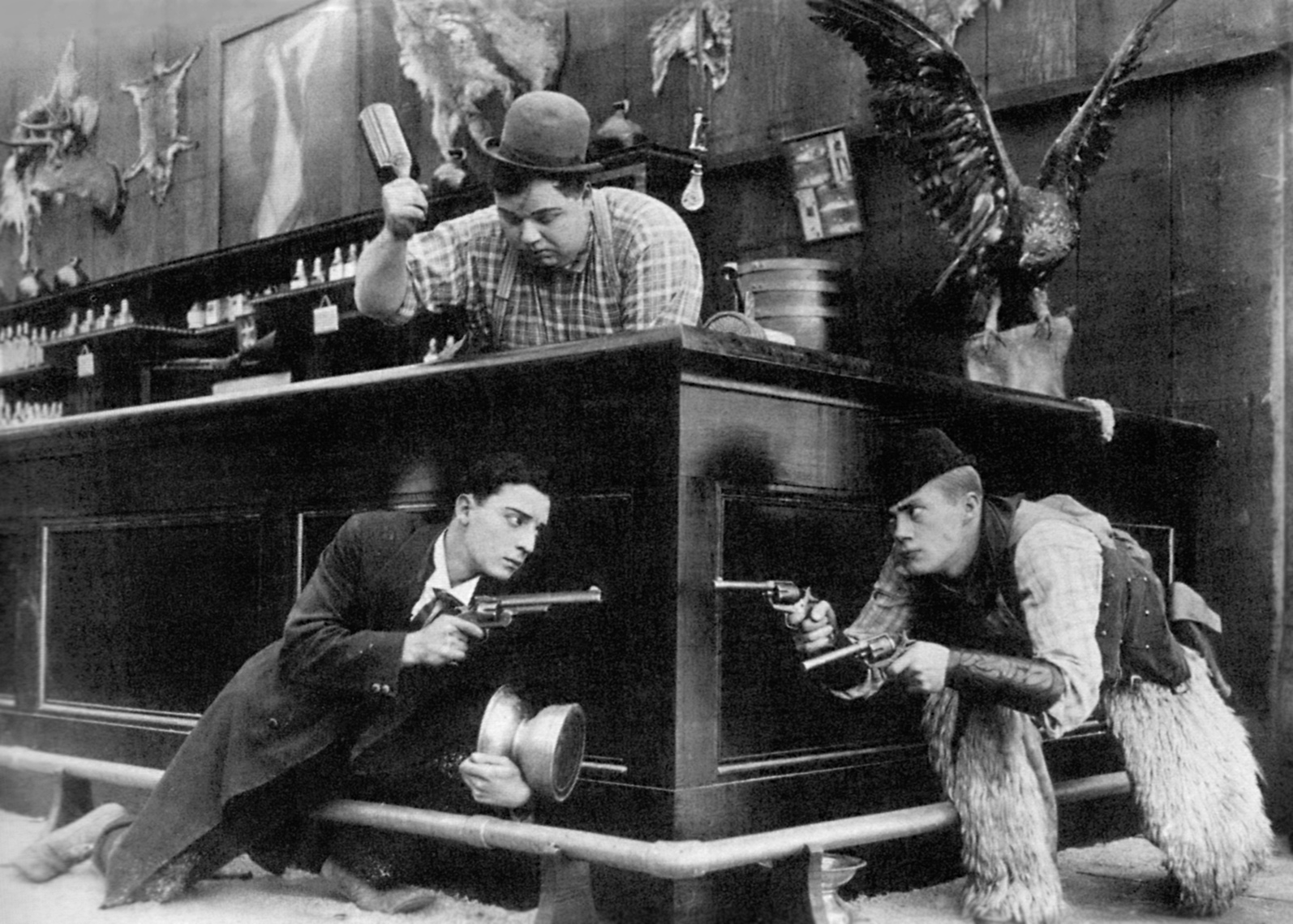
Buster Keaton, Roscoe "Fatty" Arbuckle and Al St. John in Out West, one of the titles included in ECHO

Early Cinema History Online (ECHO) is a database of very early silent-era film titles.

ECHO (Early Cinema History Online) is hosted by the Department of Communication Arts at the University of Wisconsin–Madison and engineered by Derek Long, then a Ph.D. candidate, now an Assistant Professor of Media and Cinema Studies, at the University of Illinois at Urbana-Champaign. The data compilation and indexing was initially produced from Einar Lauritzen and Gunnar Lundquist, under the title American Film-index 1908-1915: Motion Pictures, July 1908 — December 1915. This information was then digitized by Paul Spehr and Susan Dalton, with the aid of Larry Karr, and published by McFarland Publishing in 1996 as American film personnel and company credits, 1908-1920 : filmographies reordered by authoritative organizational and personal names from Lauritzen and Lundquist's American film-index.

The searchable online database format allows for trend searches and pattern matching. For example, "Databases can also help us to validate, refute or differentiate hypothesis. The online platform (ECHO), for instance, provides further evidence that at the beginning of the 20th century, a relatively large number of women in the US-American film industry had worked as scriptwriters. In order to come to this conclusion or rather to affirm existing research, media historian Derek Long, who created this filmographic database, compared the credits of 35,000 films which appeared in the US from 1908 to 1920 to the female names gathered in the Women Film Pioneers Project."

Users are encouraged to submit corrections or additions, including additional datasets.
