= PORT.hu =

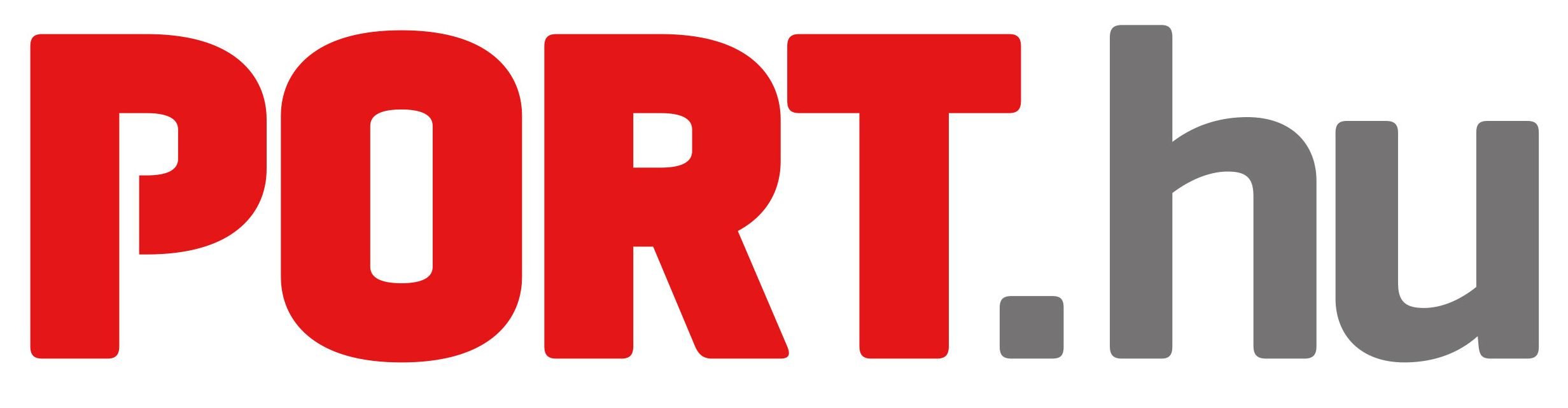
Logo of port.hu

PORT.hu is part of a Central European cultural project as a Hungarian cultural programme provider portal. It regularly collects, edits and translates television, cinema, theatre, festival, exhibition, sport, and concert programme information as well as information on restaurants and hotels in Hungary. It is operated by PORT-network, a company with Hungarian, American, and German ownership.

PORT.hu maintains and updates the programme information of over 185 television channels. They are the providers of the complete Hungarian cinema, theatre and concert, festival, exhibitions, and sports programme. It has a database of 80,000 films together with image gallery and trailers. There are over 6,000 restaurants registered on the site.

The website describes itself as the "leading independent cultural programme information portal in Hungary".

The Czech Republic, Slovakia, Romania, Croatia, and Serbia have their versions of PORT.hu.

In September 2009 the website had a traffic rank of 3,293. Within Hungary its traffic rank was 12.
