= Filmweb =

Film database

- Website type: Online film & TV database, Social networking website
- Available in: Polish
- Owner: Filmweb Sp. z o.o. Sp. k
- Creator: Artur Gortych
- Website: filmweb.pl
- Commercial: Yes
- Registration: Optional
- Launched: March 18, 1998
- Current status: Active

Filmweb is an online database of information related to films, television series, actors and film crew personnel. Since 2011, the database also contains video games. Filmweb was launched on March 18, 1998. It is a Polish-language site, and the largest Polish film database.

== History ==
Filmweb was created by Artur Gortych, and launched on March 18, 1998. On January 20, 2000, it became the first Polish website available through Wireless Application Protocol. In 2005, Filmweb PRO (aimed at entertainment professionals) was launched.

On May 20, 2010, the beta version of the website was launched, and Filmweb also started to use a new algorithm, called Gustomierz (Tastemeter). Registered users, that have rated at least 50 movies, are able to see how much particular movie is supposed to be liked by them and to find taste similar users. The engine was based on KNN and SVD theories, as well as Filmweb's own studies. The technology is still improved by expressly appointed computer scientists team. On September 16, 2010, a new design of the database home page was launched. On January 18, 2011, video games were added to the database.

The first Filmweb mobile application, for iOS, premiered in November 2011. It was followed by the release of an Android app on February 4, 2012, and a Windows Phone app in March 2012.
