= The Big Cartoon DataBase =

Website

- Available in: English
- Creator: Dave Koch
- Website: www.bcdb.com
- Registration: Optional
- Launched: 1997; 29 years ago
- Current status: Active

The Big Cartoon DataBase (or BCDB for short) is an online database of information about animated cartoons, animated feature films, animated television shows, and cartoon shorts.

The BCDB project began in 1997 as a list of Disney animated features on creator Dave Koch's local computer. In response to increasing interest in the material, the database went online in 1998 as a searchable resource dedicated to compiling information about cartoons, including production details such as voice actors, producers, and directors, as well as plot summaries and user reviews of cartoons. In 2003, BCDB became a 501(c) nonprofit corporation. By 2009, the site had 100,000 titles.

In January 2024, the whole website was taken offline. In early 2026, the main website domain showed a notice that it was for sale,, but that notice has since been removed.

In 2026, founder Dave Koch began rebuilding the Big Cartoon DataBase. The website returned online on November 11, 2026, and is now operational. Koch has said he is working to update the database and hopes to bring it current by early 2027.

== Features ==
One feature of the BCDB is its "Top Rated" page which provides a listing of the top 25 animated films as voted by the registered users of the website. Ratings are shown based on top score as well as the cartoons that receive the highest number of votes. Users are given the option of rating a film from "1" (lowest) to "10" (highest). To safeguard against attempts to skew the data, the DataBase employs data filters and a vote quota in an attempt to give an accurate Bayesian estimate. The BCDB also has a lowest-20 rated cartoons feature which, based on the same data, shows the least liked cartoons in the database.

BCDB also includes a linked, online forum, where users express their opinions about cartoons, and/or ask questions about them. The forum is available to all registered users, and is actively moderated by a team of moderators and administrators.

Other features include news items related to the animation industry and the image gallery, which allows users to see images of various cartoon characters taken from popular films.

== Recognition ==
In 2002, The San Diego Union-Tribune listed BCDB as a "top site" and wrote "with more than 42,000 cartoons, 2,000 series[,] and 1,300 cartoon reviews, this may be one of the Internet's largest searchable databases of cartoons". In 2005, Apple Hot News wrote that "The Big Cartoon Database is the place to find in depth information about any cartoon ever made". In 2006, Reference and User Services Association stated in their Eighth Annual List of Best Free Reference Web Sites that "The Big Cartoon Database is the definitive Web compendium for anyone interested in the history of animation".

The BCDB has been used as a reference by such news sources as Hartford Courant, The San Diego Union-Tribune, Oakland Tribune, Beacon News, USA Today, and the Animation World Network, among others. Que's Official Internet Yellow Pages rates the site as 5 (out of 5) stars.
