= The Soap Opera Encyclopedia (Waggett book) =

- US 1st edition cover
- Author: Gerard J. Waggett
- Language: English
- Subject: Soap operas
- Publisher: HarperPaperbacks
- Publication date: November 1997
- Publication place: United States
- Media type: Print (paperback)
- Pages: 644
- ISBN: 0-061-01157-6

The Soap Opera Encyclopedia is a 1997 reference book by Gerard J. Waggett which assembles comprehensive information about American daytime soap operas.

The Soap Opera Encyclopedia features commentary, analysis and criticism of every American daytime soap opera that had aired prior to the book's publication. It also discusses background, significant storylines and impact of each program, and lists performers and characters.

Waggett includes "The Soap Opera 100," his look at "Daytime's 100 Most Noteworthy Actors, Writers, and Producers." The book also gives overviews and background for the Daytime Emmy Awards and Soap Opera Digest Awards, and lists nominees and winners. Finally, the book lists US daytime soap opera ratings from 1952 through 1997.
