= Internet Movie Cars Database =

Online database of motor vehicle appearances in films

- Website type: Online database
- Available in: English, French, German
- Owner: Antoine Potten (2005–)
- Website: www.imcdb.org
- Registration: Optional
- Launched: 2004
- Current status: Active

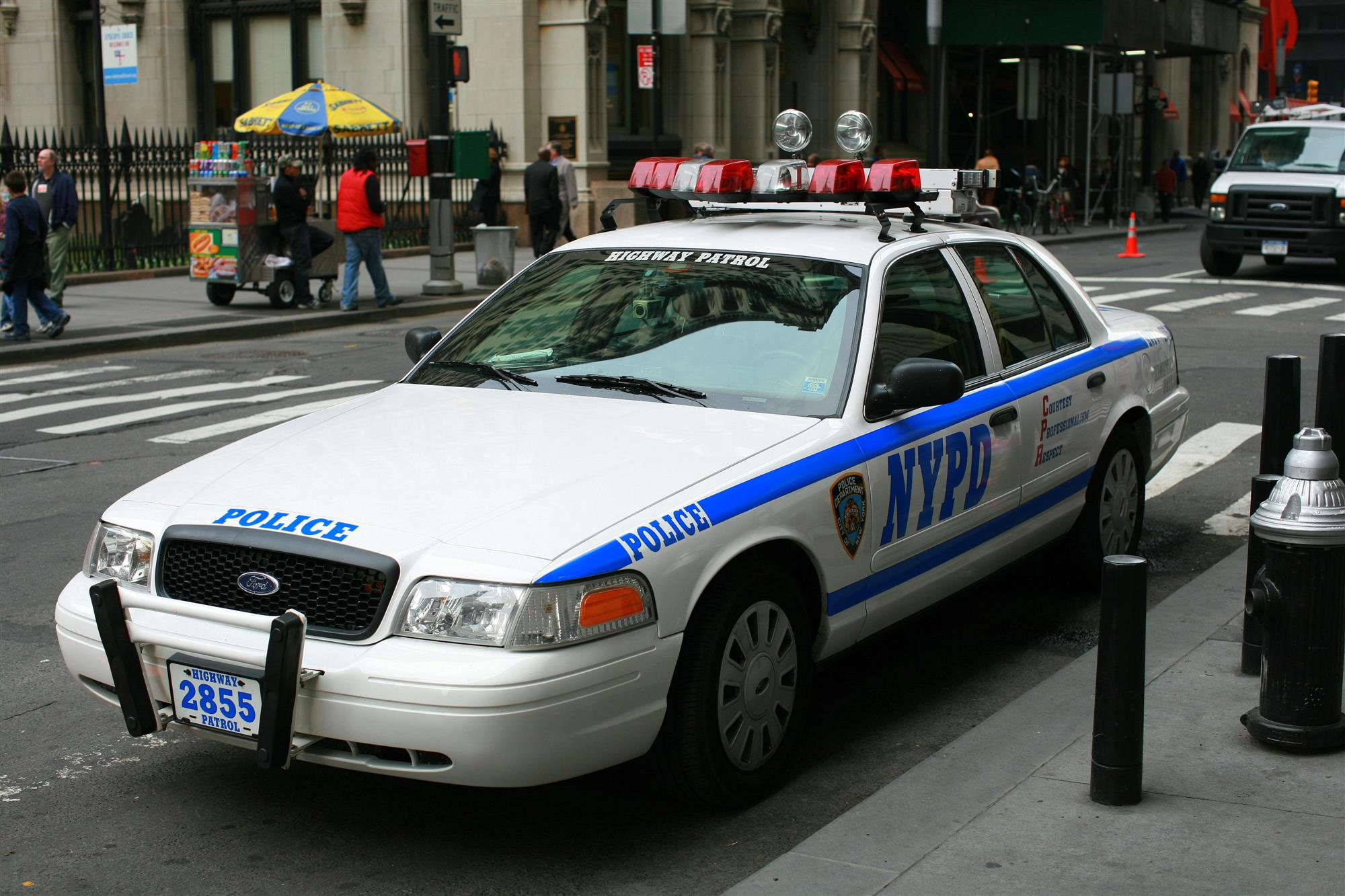
Ford Crown Victoria is the most listed vehicle on IMCDb due to its prominent use in works of fiction as a police vehicle or taxi

Internet Movie Cars Database (IMCDb) is an online database of auto, motorcycle and other motor vehicle appearances in films and anime. The website was created in 2004 with a name similar to Internet Movie Database.

== History ==
The project was founded in 2004 by a French web developer, later, helped by Belgian programmer Antoine Potten, who took over the project completely in 2005, to compile information about vehicles used in films. The website initially focused on automobiles used in movies and TV series, but eventually started to include other kinds of vehicles such as motorcycles, tanks, and heavy machinery. As of January 2026, more than 92,000 movies and TV series were analyzed and more than 1,800,000 vehicles were identified, including those used in alternate endings and cut scenes. As of January 2026, there were 6,192 brands of vehicles listed on the website, as well as more than 69,000 vehicles waiting for a proper identification.

== See also ==
- Internet Movie Firearms Database — website of similar concept for firearms
