= NewConnect =

Stock exchange located in Warsaw, Poland

- Type: Stock exchange
- Location: Warsaw, Poland
- Founded: 2007
- Owner: Warsaw Stock Exchange
- Currency: PLN
- No. of listings: 376
- Indices: NCIndex; NSX Life Science
- Website: newconnect.pl/en-home

NewConnect is an alternative stock exchange allowing smaller companies to float shares. It is run by the Warsaw Stock Exchange. The exchange is conducted outside the regulated market as a multilateral trading facility.

Compared to the main market of Warsaw Stock Exchange, NewConnect offers lower costs for floated companies, simplified entrance criteria and limited reporting requirements.

The exchange maintains two indices, which measure the performance of listed companies: the broadly composed NCIndex (which comprises all companies listed on the NewConnect) and NSX Life Science (which comprises the companies from pharmaceutical and biotechnology sectors).

== History ==
The first session took place on August 30, 2007.

NewConnect was modelled on the basis of the British Alternative Investment Market and Nordic First North alternative share markets. Its aim was to provide financing and place of exchange for shares of smaller companies that listed on the main market of the Warsaw Stock Exchange.

== List of companies ==
As of November 2021, there were 376 companies listed on the NewConnect with a market capitalisation of PLN 18.862 billion. Almost all of the listed companies are based in Poland with only 4 being foreign.
