= Movie Review Query Engine =

Online index of movie reviews

MRQE - The Movie Review Query Engine
- Website type: Aggregator of movie reviews
- Creator: Stewart M. Clamen
- Website: mrqe.com
- Commercial: Yes
- Launched: 1993

The Movie Review Query Engine, also known as MRQE, is an online index of movie reviews. Registered users are able to access movie-specific forums and provide their own reviews. The site aggregates reviews, news, interviews, and other material associated to specific movies. The site also provides a searchable index of all new film releases and DVD reviews.

Since 1993, its database and search engine have been continuously upgraded by Stewart Clamen. MRQE's database of movies includes classic and modern films, foreign and domestic films, major releases and independent films. MRQE also provides information for movies in theaters, movies out on DVD/Blu-ray; plus movies shown on AMC, Turner Classic Movies (TCM), and Independent Film Channel (IFC) channels. Through its partnership with the New York business development and investment firm Loft Group, and with movie blogs, their content is collected in the MRQE database and made available for search by any user.
