= FindAnyFilm =

Online film listing database

- Website type: Movie, DVD, Downloads, Blu-ray, and TV Listing database
- Available in: English
- Website: www.findanyfilm.com
- Commercial: No
- Launched: 2009
- Current status: Active

FindAnyFilm is an online film search service, which aggregates film and film availability information into one place. Users are able to find movies based on search terms including titles, actors, genres, or cinema names.

It was launched on 28 January 2009, by the UK Film Council, the UK Government backed lead agency for film in the UK which ensures that the economic, cultural and educational aspects of film are effectively represented at home and abroad. The site's aims include raising the awareness of and promoting the use of legal mediums for viewing films – working towards the eradication of piracy. Details of over 30,000 individual film records are held on the site. It targets film fans in the UK, but holds details on films made in over 60 different languages – ranging from English, Japanese, Hindi, Arabic, French and Cantonese.

Visitors to the site can search for a film they would like to see, and then choose their preferred viewing medium including DVD, Blu-ray, cinemas, via legal downloads, and through seven days of forthcoming television listings.

Film listings are segmented into 20 genres (including action, foreign, classic, thriller, bollywood and drama), and users can also search by requesting a mood, location or using a phrase such as 'fairy tale ending'.
