= Ralph Papakhian =

American librarian

A. Ralph Papakhian
- Born: Arsen Ralph Papakhian; December 28, 1948; Detroit, Michigan, U.S.
- Died: January 14, 2010 (aged 61); Bloomington, Indiana, U.S.
- Other name: Raffi Papakhian
- Education: Western Michigan University (BA, MM, MS)
- Occupations: Librarian; Educator
- Employers: Indiana University; University of Florida

Arsen Ralph Papakhian (Western Armenian: Արսէն Ռաֆֆի Փափախեան, romanized: Arsēn Ṛaffi Pʻapʻakhean, December 28, 1948 – January 14, 2010) was an Armenian-American music cataloging librarian and educator. Papakhian was head of technical services at the William and Gayle Cook Music Library for thirty-four years and is known for his role in the development of library cataloging, authority control, and music librarianship in the late 20th century.

== Biography ==
Ralph Papakhian was born on December 28, 1948, in Detroit, Michigan to Armenian immigrant parents. His father, Reverend Souren Papakhian, (Note: Western Armenian: Սուրէն Փափախեան, romanized: Surēn Pʿapʿakhean) was a Mushetsi Armenian born in 1897 in the Armenian village of Khachaluys, Bitlis Vilayet, Ottoman Empire (present-day Halilçavuş, Turkey). His mother, Yeretzghin Shoushanig Papakhian, was a Musalertsi Armenian born in the Armenian village of Bitias, Aleppo Vilayet, Ottoman Empire. (present-day Batıayaz, Turkey) Souren was Arch Priest at Saint Sarkis Armenian Apostolic Church, where Shoushanig was a teacher. Ralph Papakhian earned a Bachelor of Arts in music history (1971), a Master of Music in musicology and music theory (1973), and a Master of Science in librarianship (1973) from Western Michigan University. After completing his education, Ralph began his career in August 1973 as humanities cataloger at the University of Florida in Gainesville before joining Indiana University in Bloomington as music librarian in September 1975 at age 26, where he worked for the rest of his life.

In the 1970s and 1980s, Papakhian was a leader during the transition from card catalogs to online systems. Papakhian was a founding member of the Music OCLC Users Group (MOUG) in 1978, an organization that develops guidelines for cataloging music using MARC (machine-readable cataloging) standards. MOUG became the first organization to implement a new MARC format prior to its introduction by the Library of Congress, which was hampered by delays in adopting MARC standards for music. Papakhian's efforts to mobilize the community to take charge of its own future proved to be foundational to the profession. Ralph later served as chair of MOUG in 1993–97, and he created MOUG's first website in 1996. In 1984–90, Papakhian managed Indiana's participation in the Associated Music Libraries Group Title II-C grant issued by the Department of Education for retrospective conversion, the computerization of data printed on catalog cards. This work allowed online access to catalog records for IU's vast collections of music. In 1988, the Title II-C grant work led Papakhian to oversee the transformation of the REMUS project (Retrospective Music project) into the NACO Music Project (NMP), a cooperative initiative to build a database of authorized music headings, of which Papakhian was coordinator until 2010. The NMP continues to be the leading organization on authority control for music within the Program for Cooperative Cataloging.

Ralph was an early adopter of electronic communication technologies. In 1989, Ralph founded the Music Library Association's MLA-L email list shortly after Indiana University's adoption of the newly created LISTSERV software, and served as MLA-L's listowner. MLA-L remains a primary forum for information exchange among music librarians. Ralph held multiple leadership roles in the Music Library Association—including officer, committee chair, and author—serving on the board as assistant fiscal officer and fiscal officer (1986–88) and as executive secretary (1988–92). In 1985, Papakhian was promoted to the rank of Full Librarian, equivalent to full professor. At Indiana University, Papakhian was a staunch advocate for faculty governance and salary transparency, and was responsible for the university's first online open faculty salary listings. Papakhian was active in the Indiana University Faculty Council and helped organize a chapter of the American Federation of Teachers on the Bloomington campus. Papakhian died in Bloomington, Indiana on January 14, 2010. He was survived by his wife, four children, and five grandchildren.

== Legacy ==
Ralph Papakhian is still known widely for his role as a teacher, having trained hundreds of music catalogers, many of whom today occupy preeminent cataloging positions in the United States. Beginning in the late 1970s, Papakhian taught classes and supervised internships for graduate students enrolled in IU's music librarianship specialization, offered today by the Luddy School of Informatics, Computing, and Engineering. In the mid-1990s, Papakhian established a summer cataloging workshop at Indiana University with colleague Sue Stancu. Papakhian is remembered for emphasizing accuracy, curiosity, and intellectual rigor in cataloging and metadata.

Papakhian was recipient of the Music Library Association (MLA) Richard S. Hill Award in 1983 and 2002; the Music OCLC Users Group (MOUG) Distinguished Service Award in 2005; the MLA Citation Award, the MLA's highest honor, in 2008; and the MLA Special Achievement Award in 1992, which was renamed the A. Ralph Papakhian Special Achievement Award in 2011. Also dedicated to Papakhian are MOUG's Ralph Papakhian Travel Grant, Indiana University's A. Ralph Papakhian Graduate Scholarship in Music Librarianship, and the Bloomington Community Band's Ralph Papakhian Library Internship.

== Bibliography ==
- Smiraglia, Richard P. (2006). "From James Duff Brown (1897) to Arsen Ralph Papakhian (2000): An Essay on the Literature of the Bibliographic Control of Music". Bibliographic Control of Music, 1897-2000. Lanham, Maryland: Scarecrow Press. OCLC 62290636.
- Papakhian, A. Ralph (2000). "Cataloging". Music Librarianship at the Turn of the Century. MLA Technical Reports, No. 27. Lanham, Maryland: Scarecrow Press. OCLC 43978182.
- Papakhian, A. R. "Cataloging". Notes. 53 (3): 581–590. OCLC 45595520.
- Papakhian, A. Ralph (1989). "NACO-Music Project Update". Authority Control in Music Libraries. MLA Technical Reports, No. 16. Canton, Massachusetts: Music Library Association. OCLC 20452523.
- Papakhian, A. R. "The Frequency of Personal Name Headings in the Indiana University Music Library Card Catalogs". Library Resources & Technical Services. 29: 273–285. OCLC 1696755.
- Papakhian, Arsen Ralph (1984). "Uniquely Musical Access Points (Coded)". Retrospective Conversion of Music Materials. Washington, D.C.: Bibliographic Service Development Program, Council on Library Resources. OCLC 11186070.
- Papakhian, Arsen Ralph (1973). Jean Philippe Rameau's Demonstration du principe de l'harmonie (1750) and Pierre Esteve's Nouvelle decouverte du principe de l'harmonie (1752): A Translation (Master of Music thesis). Kalamazoo, Michigan: Western Michigan University. OCLC 8636752. ProQuest 302702661.
