= 2Blades =

Non-profit agricultural phytopathology organization

2Blades is an agricultural phytopathology non-profit which performs research to improve durable genetic resistance in crops, and funds other researchers to do the same. 2Blades was co-founded by Dr. Roger Freedman and Dr. Diana Horvath in 2004.

== Funding source ==
2Blades is partly funded by the Gatsby Charitable Foundation does its research at The Sainsbury Laboratory, among other locations. One co-founder, Chairman Roger Freedman also works for Gatsby, which was founded by Lord David Sainsbury. Freedman had pitched an idea to Sainsbury's venture capital company to begin investing in plant genetic engineering technologies, and although the board did so, they found someone else to lead it. Freedman had wanted to run it, but was told that was not for him by Sainsbury. Indeed, soon thereafter Sainsbury set up another early investment company specifically for Freedman and a colleague, and a separate non-profit for Freedman to grant money, both for plant science. The non-profit was 2Blades.

== Research activities ==
2Blades routinely works in partnership with other crop disease organizations like CIMMYT and BGRI. The foundation also conducts research in partnerships with the industry, including with Bayer CropScience and Monsanto. The organisation's End the Blight campaign has been joined by CIP (the International Potato Center) and Chairman of Joseph P. Kennedy Enterprises Christopher Kennedy. This campaign is advancing research and delivering cultivars specifically for Phytophthora infestans in Africa. Mr Kennedy is chairman of 2Blades African Potato Initiative which is funding the delivery of a Victoria-based cultivar to East African markets.

The GEMS Informatics initiative at the University of Minnesota, which is a joint venture between the College of Food, Agricultural and Natural Resource Sciences (CFANS) and the College of Biological Sciences (CBS), partners with 2Blades to create a gene discovery platform.

Crops and pathogens of research interest to the foundation include P. infestans on potato, rye, Phakopsora pachyrhizi on soybean, Puccinia graminis f. sp. tritici on wheat, and Fusarium oxysporum f.sp. cubense on Musa spp.

== Bibliography of affiliated personnel ==
- Freedman, Roger Prester (23 October 1969). Some features of the structure and function of the genetic elements of bacteriophages (PhD). University of Cambridge Laboratory of Molecular Biology. p. 165. (ISNI 0000000134837464). BLDSC number: D1141/71. Jisc text ill. BL EThOS ID uk.bl.ethos.455951
- Horvath, Diana (1991). Investigation of the MerR and PcoR metalloregulatory proteins: Molecular mechanisms of mercury and copper signal transduction and transcriptional activation (Thesis). Northwestern University.
- Schornack, Sebastian; Moscou, Matthew J.; Ward, Eric R.; Horvath, Diana M. (2013-08-04). "Engineering Plant Disease Resistance Based on TAL Effectors". Annual Review of Phytopathology. 51 (1). Annual Reviews: 383–406. doi:10.1146/annurev-phyto-082712-102255. ISSN 0066-4286. PMID 23725472.
- Dangl, Jeffery L.; Horvath, Diana M.; Staskawicz, Brian J. (2013-08-15). "Pivoting the Plant Immune System from Dissection to Deployment". Science. 341 (6147). American Association for the Advancement of Science: 746–751. Bibcode:2013Sci...341..746D. doi:10.1126/science.1236011. ISSN 0036-8075. PMC 3869199. PMID 23950531. S2CID 206548210.

- "Corrections and Clarifications". Science. 341 (6151). American Association for the Advancement of Science: 1175. 2013-09-12. doi:10.1126/science.341.6151.1175-a. ISSN 0036-8075.

- Luo, Ming; Xie, Liqiong; Chakraborty, Soma; Wang, Aihua; Matny, Oadi; Jugovich, Michelle; Kolmer, James A.; Richardson, Terese; Bhatt, Dhara; Hoque, Mohammad; Patpour, Mehran; Sørensen, Chris; Ortiz, Diana; Dodds, Peter; Steuernagel, Burkhard; Wulff, Brande B. H.; Upadhyaya, Narayana M.; Mago, Rohit; Periyannan, Sambasivam; Lagudah, Evans; Freedman, Roger; Lynne Reuber, T.; Steffenson, Brian J.; Ayliffe, Michael (2021-01-04). "A five-transgene cassette confers broad-spectrum resistance to a fungal rust pathogen in wheat" (PDF). Nature Biotechnology. 39 (5). Nature Research: 561–566. doi:10.1038/s41587-020-00770-x. ISSN 1087-0156. PMID 33398152. S2CID 230508442. PD ORCID 0000-0003-0620-5923 GS N3w9QUUAAAAJ RID D-1181-2009. RF ISNI 0000000134837464.

- "A five-transgene cassette confers broad-spectrum resistance to a fungal rust pathogen in wheat". Nature Portfolio Bioengineering Community. 2020-12-09. PD ORCID 0000-0003-0620-5923 GS N3w9QUUAAAAJ RID D-1181-2009. RF ISNI 0000000134837464.
- Oadi N. Matny, Mehran Patpour, Ming Luo, Liqiong Xie, Soma Chakraborty, Aihua Wang, James A. Kolmer, Terese Richardson, Dhara Bhatt, Mohammad Hoque, Chris Sorenson, Burkhard Steuernagel, Brande B. H. Wulff, Narayana Upadhyaya, Rohit Mago, Sam Periyannan, Evans Lagudah, Roger Freedman (ISNI 0000000134837464), Lynne Reuber, Brian J. Steffenson, and Michael Ayliffe, A Wheat Multi-Transgene Cassette Provides Stem and Leaf Rust Resistance in the Field. In Plant and Animal Genome XXVIII Conference (January 11-15, 2020). PAG.
