= International Standard Name Identifier =

Identifier for people and organizations

- Acronym: ISNI
- Organisation: ISNI-IA
- Introduced: March 15, 2012
- No. of digits: 16
- Check digit: MOD 11-2
- Example: 000000012146438X
- Website: isni.org

The International Standard Name Identifier (ISNI) is an identifier system for uniquely identifying the public identities of contributors to media content such as books, television programmes, and newspaper articles. Such an identifier consists of 16 digits. It can optionally be displayed as divided into four blocks.

ISNI can be used to disambiguate named entities that might otherwise be confused, and links the data about names that are collected and used in all sectors of the media industries.

It was developed under the auspices of the International Organization for Standardization (ISO) as Draft International Standard 27729; the valid standard was published on 15 March 2012. The ISO technical committee 46, subcommittee 9 (TC 46/SC 9) is responsible for the development of the standard.

== ISNI format ==
ISNI consists of 15 digits followed by a check character. The check character may be either a decimal digit or the character "X". The check character is calculated using the preceding 15 decimal digits using the ISO/IEC 7064, MOD11-2 algorithm.

=== Format without space ===
- MARC: it was proposed to store the ISNI without spaces, e.g.(isni)1234567899999799
- isni.org URL: no spaces, e.g.
  - http://www.isni.org/isni/000000012146438X (old)
  - https://isni.org/isni/000000012146438X (current)
  - https://isni.org/000000012146438X (alternative)
- viaf.org:
  - URL https://viaf.org/viaf/sourceID/ISNI%7C000000012146438X
  - URL https://viaf.org/processed/ISNI%7C000000012146438X
  - the data dumps contain it in form ISNI|000000012146438X

=== Format with space ===
In display it is frequently shown with spaces.

- isni.org
- viaf.org

== Uses of an ISNI ==
The ISNI allows a single identity (such as an author's pseudonym or the imprint used by a publisher) to be identified using a unique number. This unique number can then be linked to any of the numerous other identifiers that are used across the media industries to identify names and other forms of identity.

An example of the use of such a number is the identification of a musical performer who is also a writer both of music and of poems. While they might be identified in various databases using numerous private and public identification systems, under the ISNI system, they would have a single linking ISNI record. The many different databases could then exchange data about that particular identity without resorting to messy methods such as comparing text strings. An often quoted example in the English language world is the difficulty faced when identifying 'John Smith' in a database. While there may be many records for 'John Smith', it is not always clear which record refers to the specific 'John Smith' that is required.

If an author has published under several different names or pseudonyms, each such name will receive its own ISNI.

ISNI can be used by libraries and archives when sharing catalogue information; for more precise searching for information online and in databases, and it can aid the management of rights across national borders and in the digital environment.

== Organisations involved in the management ==
=== ISNI Registration Authority ===
According to ISO the Registration Authority for ISO 27729:2012 is the "ISNI International Agency". It is located in London (c/o EDItEUR)

It is incorporated under the Companies Act 2006 as a private company limited by guarantee.

The 'International Agency' is commonly known as the ISNI-IA.

This UK registered, not-for-profit company has been founded by a consortium of organisations consisting of the Confédération Internationale des Sociétés d'Auteurs et Compositeurs (CISAC), the Conference of European National Librarians (CENL), the International Federation of Reproduction Rights Organisations (IFRRO), the International Performers Database Association (IPDA), the Online Computer Library Center (OCLC) and ProQuest. It is managed by directors nominated from these organisations and, in the case of CENL, by representatives of the Bibliothèque nationale de France and the British Library.

=== ISNI Registration Agencies ===
A registration agency provides the interface between ISNI applicants and the ISNI Assignment Agency.

List of Registration Agencies in order as on ISNI-IA website
Name (as on ISNI-IA website)	Since	Relation
AETIS (Online Platform for Intellectual Property protection)		
AIIMCC (Asociación Intercontinental Independiente Multidisciplinaria de Creadores y Creativos, A.C.)		
Bibliographic Data Services		
Bibliothèque et Archives Nationales du Québec (BAnQ)		Canada
BnF (Bibliothèque nationale de France)	2014	France
Bibliothèque nationale de Luxembourg		Luxembourg
Bodleian Library, University of Oxford		
British Library		United Kingdom
Câmara Brasileira do Livro (CBL)		Brazil
Cambridge University Library		
Casalini Libri		Italy
China Knowledge Centre for Engineering Sciences and Technology (CKCEST)		China
Consolidated Independent (CI)		United Kingdom
Dilicom		
FGEE (Federación de Gremios de Editores de España)		Spain
ICCU (Istituto Centrale per il Catalogo Unico della Biblioteche Italiane per le informazioni bibliografiche)		Italy
Intellectual Property Office of the Philippines (IPOPHL)		Philippines
Koninklijke Bibliotheek		Netherlands
KBR (Royal Library of Belgium)		Belgium
Library of Trinity College Dublin, University of Dublin		
MétaMusique		
Muso.AI		
MVB		Germany
National Assembly Library of Korea		South Korea
National Library of Finland		Finland
National Library of Korea		South Korea
National Library of Norway		
National Library of Poland		Poland
National Library of Scotland		
National Library of Wales		
Orfium		
Program for Cooperative Cataloging (PCC)		
Quansic		Switzerland
Republic of Türkiye Ministry of Culture and Tourism		
Ringgold		organisations, international
Rovix Inc.		
Sound Credit/ Soundways		United States
SPARWK		
Switchchord		
Takwene	2021	MENA
Warner Music Group (WMG)		
World Intellectual Property Organization	2024	International
YouTube	2018	international

In 2018, YouTube became an ISNI registry, and announced its intention to begin creating ISNI IDs for the musicians whose videos it features. ISNI anticipates the number of ISNI IDs "going up by perhaps 3-5 million over the next couple of years" as a result.

In 2020, Sound Credit, together with ISNI, announced that music industry ISNI registrations were free and automated. The free registration system is part of Sound Credit user profile creation, used by its larger system for music crediting. It includes an automated search to avoid duplicate ISNIs and a certificate generated by the Sound Credit registration system to officiate newly registered ISNIs.

In 2024, WIPO became an ISNI Registration Agency, enabling its network of Collective Management Organizations around the world to assign ISNI IDs to creators. Through this integration, WIPO aims to facilitate the assignment of unique identifiers to a broad range of creators, including musicians, writers, and other artistic professionals. This move was set to enhance the discoverability and attribution of creative works on a global scale.

=== ISNI members ===
ISNI members (ISNI-IA Members) as of 2025-01-18:

- ABES (French Bibliographic Agency for Higher Education)
- Apple
- BookNet Canada
- Brill Publishers
- CEDRO (Centro Español de Derechos Reprográficos)
- FCCN
- French National Archives (Archives nationales de France)
- Harvard University
- Hogeschool van Amsterdam
- Hogeschool van Arnhem en Nijmegen
- Irish Copyright Licensing Agency (ICLA)
- ISSN International Centre
- Library of Congress
- Maastricht University
- Meta4Books
- National Library of New Zealand
- National Library of Sweden (Kungliga Biblioteket)
- Netherlands Institute for Sound & Vision
- Publisher's Licensing Services
- Radboud Universiteit
- Rijksuniversiteit Groningen
- Scribd
- Spotify
- Technische Universiteit Eindhoven
- Universiteit Leiden
- Universiteit van Amsterdam
- University of Twente
- University of Utrecht
- Vrije Universiteit Amsterdam
- Wageningen University & Research

== Copyright ==
A subset of the data is available under CC0.

== ISNI assignment ==
ISNI-IA uses an assignment system comprising a user interface, data-schema, disambiguation algorithms, and database that meets the requirements of the ISO standard, while also using existing technology where possible. The system is based primarily on the Virtual International Authority File (VIAF) service, which has been developed by OCLC for use in the aggregation of library catalogues.

Access to the assignment system and database, and to the numbers that are generated as the output of the process, are controlled by independent bodies known as registration agencies. These registration agencies deal directly with customers, ensuring that data is provided in appropriate formats and recompensing the ISNI-IA for the cost of maintaining the assignment system. Registration agencies are appointed by ISNI-IA but will be managed and funded independently.

== ISNI coverage ==
The following table lists ISNI coverage counts, for millions of identities of all types, millions of people, millions of researchers (also included in people), and organisations.

As of	Identities (M)	Individuals (M)	Researchers (M)	Organisations
2017-08-05	9.41	8.757	2.606	654,074
2018-04-19	9.86	9.15	2.86	714,401
2018-07-11	10	9.28	2.87	717,204
2018-08-13	10	9.32	2.87	717,795
2018-10-17	10	9.39	2.87	719,010
2018-12-05	10	9.4	2.88	826,810
2019-03-11	10	9.59	2.88	864,999
2019-06-21	10.5	9.6	2.88	876,017
2019-11-27	10.92	10.01	2.89	908,299
2020-02-13	11.02	10.11	2.91	912,991
2020-10-20	11.51	10.45	2.91	1,062,333
2021-05-30	12.22	11.10	2.93	1,119,480
2021-11-17	14.38	12.79	2.94	1,591,038
2022-09-01	14.7	13.11	2.97	1,645,434
2022-12-25	14.8	13.21	2.97	1,680,892
2023-05-10	15	13.3	2.98	1,705,025
2025-10-13	16.4	14.3		2,017,936

== See also ==
- Authority control
- Digital Author Identification (DAI)
- Digital object identifier (DOI)
- GRID
- International Standard Text Code (ISTC)
- ORCID (Open Researcher and Contributor ID)
- ResearcherID
- Ringgold identifier
