= Metadata Authority Description Schema =

XML schema

Metadata Authority Description Schema (MADS) is an XML schema and RDF Schema developed by the United States Library of Congress' Network Development and Standards Office that provides an authority element set to complement the Metadata Object Description Schema (MODS).

== History ==
- April 2004: Preliminary version for review
- December 2004: Draft for review
- April 2005: Version 1.0 published
- June 2011: Version 2.0 published
- September 2016: Version 2.1 published

== What MADS Is ==
MADS does authority control. It is a schema to define people, organizations, and geographical locations which can be involved in creating or publishing a creative work, publication, or artifact. Descriptive schemas for creative works and publications can reference MADS, with the underlying descriptive schema describing the item and referencing a MADS record which describes a creator or location. Authority control allows precise work with issues such as distinguishing multiple authors who share a name, sorting a list of books based on where each was published, and identifying all publications by scholars who are members of a specific organization or graduates of a specific college.

MADS is a schema for carrying authority control information and for describing authorities. It is not a controlled vocabulary nor a registry. It can reference controlled vocabularies or registries, such as Virtual International Authority File (VIAF), Open Researcher and Contributor ID (ORCID), or the Getty Thesaurus of Geographic Names (TGN).

== MADS/RDF ==
MADS was originally formulated as an XML schema, but it also has an expression in Resource Description Framework (RDF), called MADS/RDF. MADS/RDF expresses and makes statements about Authorities and their Variants, which are controlled records, and distinguishes these from the real-world objects (RWOs) they describe.

The Library of Congress had been representing bibliographic authority data in Simple Knowledge Organization System (SKOS) since 2009. However, they found that they couldn’t present the full structure of authorities such as the LC Subject Headings (LCSH) in a general-purpose form such as SKOS. MADS/RDF is intended to complement SKOS: its classes and properties are subclasses of appropriate SKOS items. For example, madsrdf:Authority is a sub-class of skos:Concept, and madsrdf:authoritativeLabel is a sub-property of skos:prefLabel.

MADS/RDF authority items use both authoritativeLabels, which are structured strings like "United States--New Jersey--Essex--Montclair", and collections of typed nodes such as {Country, State, County, City}.
