= Digital Author Identifier =

Authority control for Dutch academic authors

The Digital Author Identifier (DAI) was a Dutch initiative to create an person identifier for researchers to (1) enhance linkability of scholarly communication and other types of output to a single author and (2) to disambiguate between authors with similar or even the same names.

As a form of authority control, DAI was envisioned to assign a unique national id for every author active within a Dutch university, university of applied sciences, or research institute. The DAI is prepared from the ISO standard "ISNI" (International Standard Name Identifier). The DAI links the PICA database in institutional libraries with the METIS national research information system subsequently made available to international search engines. Specifically, SURFfoundation has, in cooperation with OCLC PICA, created a connection with PICA National Thesaurus Authornames (NTA) that is supplied and maintained by university libraries. Important to this is the connection between the research information system Metis and the repositories.

== Superseded by ORCID ==
The DAI was part of the national knowledge infrastructure, but the (Dutch) scientific community, has been using other identifiers as well, such as ORCID, ResearcherID, and ScopusId. In the Netherlands, in 2025, the research community seems to have been converging towards using ORCID as the national identifier based on the fact that universities, and the KNAW promote the use of ORCID, not DAI.

== See also ==
- ORCID
- VIAF
