= Decision (journal) =

- Discipline: Decision theory, business, management
- Language: English
- Edited by: Priya Seetharaman

Publication details
- History: 1974-present
- Publisher: Springer
- Frequency: Quarterly
- Impact factor: 1.5 (2023)

Standard abbreviations
- ISO 4: Decision

Indexing
- ISSN: 0304-0941 (print); 2197-1722 (web)

Links
- Journal homepage

Decision is a peer-reviewed academic journal covering research about decision making within the boundaries of an organization, as well as decisions involving inter-firm coordination. According to the 2023 Journal Citation Reports, Decision Sciences has an impact factor of 1.5, placing it in the third quartile (286/401) of journals in the category of management. Decision Sciences is published by Springer Science+Business Media on behalf of the Indian Institute of Management Calcutta. The editor (as of 2026) is Megha Sharma.

The journal is abstracted and indexed in:

- Baidu
- CLOCKSS
- CNKI
- CNPIEC (China National Publications Import & Export Company)
- Dimensions
- EBSCO
- Emerging Sources Citation Index
- Google Scholar
- Naver
- OCLC WorldCat Discovery Service
- Portico
- ProQuest
- Research Papers in Economics (RePEc)
- TD Net Discovery Service
- UGC-CARE List (India)
- Wanfang
