= Global Release Identifier =

System to identify digital music releases

The Global Release Identifier (GRid) is a system to identify releases of digital sound recordings (and other digital data) for electronic distribution. It is designed to be integrated with identification systems deployed by key stakeholders from across the music industry.

(GRid should not be confused with the Global Repertoire Database (GRD), a system to track ownership and control of musical works, which was planned from 2008–2014 but ultimately failed.)

== Basic construction ==
A GRid consists of 18 alphanumerical characters (numerical digits and capital letters as defined in ISO/IEC 646:1991-IRV, which is identical to ASCII) that are grouped into four elements as follows:

Identifier Scheme element (2 characters)
“A1” denotes a GRid.
Issuer Code element (5 characters)
A unique identifier of the organisation responsible for allocating the GRid, issued by the International GRid Authority (i.e., the IFPI).
Release Number element (10 characters)
Uniquely identifies the specific bundle of digital resources compiled by the issuer, where “a digital resource is a digital fixation of an expression of an abstract work, such as a sound recording, an audio-visual recording, a photograph, software, a graphic image or a passage of text.”
Check Character element (1 character)
The check character is computed according to ISO 7064:1983 Mod 37, 36.

When a GRid is written, printed or otherwise visually presented, the four elements of the GRid should be separated from each other by a hyphen. For clarity, it can also be prefixed with “GRid:”. Neither the hyphens nor the “GRid:”-prefix form part of the GRid. It is recommended that when a GRid is visually presented, the font used should clearly distinguish between the digits ‘1’ and ‘0’ on the one hand, and the letters ‘I’ and ‘O’ on the other hand.

The following character strings all denote the same GRid:

- A12425GABC1234002M
- A1-2425G-ABC1234002-M
- GRid:A1-2425G-ABC1234002-M

Where:

- A1 – Identifier Scheme element
- 2425G – Issuer Code element
- ABC1234002 – Release Number element
- M – Check Character element

== Registration ==
GRid codes can be registered through becoming a GRid issuer with the IFPI or by using the GRid generator contained in the Sound Credit desktop application.

== See also ==
- International Standard Recording Code (ISRC)
