= International Standard Authority Data Number =

Proposed unique identifier registry for authority data entities

The International Standard Authority Data Number (ISADN) was a registry proposed by the International Federation of Library Associations and Institutions (IFLA) to provide and maintain unique identifiers for entities described in authority data. Having such a unique number would have the benefits of being language-independent and system-independent.

Francoise Bourdon was a major proponent of such a standard, proposing a structure for the ISADN and recommending that the number uniquely identify authority records, rather than their subjects.

A 1989 article by Delsey described the work on the IFLA Working Group on an International Authority System, spending a good portion of time on conceptualizing an international standard number "that will facilitate the linkage of variant authorities for the same identity." Their discussion was very complex in its discussion of which agencies would actually assign such numbers. For example, a national library might be tasked with assigning identifiers to authors within its country, but this would lead to duplicate identifiers for authority data that describe transnational people.

The project was ultimately determined to be unfeasible. Tillett suggested that the cluster identifiers used by the Virtual International Authority File might meet the needs expressed in the proposal.

The concept of an ISADN continues to be relevant to the information science community, as it could be a great help in the problem of measuring an individual author's research output.

== See also ==
- Virtual International Authority File (VIAF)
