= Ringgold identifier =

Identifier for organisations in the publishing industry

Ringgold ID
- Ringgold logo
- Subject: Organizations in the publishing industry supply chain
- Full name: Ringgold Identifier
- Acronym: RIN
- Organisation: Ringgold, Inc.; Ringgold, Ltd.
- Introduced: 2003
- No. issued: >518,000
- Example: RIN 5072 (Wellcome Trust)
- Website: www.ringgold.com/ringgold-identifier/

A Ringgold Identifier (Ringgold ID or RIN) is a persistent numeric unique identifier for organizations in the publishing industry supply chain. Ringgold's Identify Database includes over 500,000 Ringgold IDs representing organizations and consortia that acquire scholarly publications and content.

The Ringgold ID was introduced in 2003. Ringgold developed it in response to an issue raised by Oxford University Press, namely how to identify institutional subscribers unambiguously. The system is owned and administered by Ringgold, Inc. and Ringgold, Ltd., who also publish a taxonomy for classifying the subject interests of the listed organizations.

Ringgold is an International Standard Name Identifier (ISNI) registration agency, and as such the US National Information Standards Organization (NISO) recommended that Ringgold IDs be used to identify organizations involved in scholarly communications. Ringgold Identifiers were used by ORCID, to record the institutional affiliation of individual researchers. ORCID announced in 2023 that it will end its support of Ringgold.

== See also ==
- Research Organization Registry, a community-led dataset that aims to provide a persistent identifier for every research organization in the world.
