= MarcEdit =

Metadata editing software

- Developer: Terry Reese
- Release: September 2006
- Stable release: 7.7.x / October 9, 2025; 13 months ago
- Operating system: Windows / macOS / Linux
- Platform: Cross-platform
- Available in: English
- Type: Library and information science software
- License: Freeware
- Website: http://marcedit.reeset.net/

MarcEdit is a metadata editing software suite used primarily to create and manipulate MARC records. Originally developed by Terry Reese in 1999 for a major database cleanup project at Oregon State University, the software was released for wider use in the LIS field. As of 2011, it was used in 143 countries.

== Use cases ==
- MarcEdit can be used with XSLT to retrieve records from remote servers via Z39.50 and then map their contents to another metadata schema.
- Catalogers can use MarcEdit's implementation of the OCLC Worldcat API to read and write records in WorldCat.
- MarcEdit can be used to batch-edit authority records.
- MarcEdit can add dereferenceable URIs to bibliographic records that use authority control that uniquely identify the relevant authority record.
