= BroadwayWorld =

American theatre news website

- Screenshot
- Available in: English
- Headquarters: New York City, New York, {{{location_country}}}
- Country of origin: United States
- Area served: Worldwide
- Industry: Theatre news
- Parent: Wisdom Digital Media Publishing
- Website: broadwayworld.com
- Launched: 2003; 23 years ago

BroadwayWorld is a theatre news website based in New York City, New York. Launched in 2003, the site covers Broadway, Off-Broadway, regional, and international theater productions, with sections devoted to particular countries, cities, or regions. The website publishes theatre news, interviews, reviews, and other coverage related to theater. It also includes an online message board for theater fans.

The UK / West End section awards the UK / West End BroadwayWorld Awards each year, based on votes by theater-goers to productions in the UK.

== History ==
Published by Wisdom Digital Media Publishing (launched in 2001), BroadwayWorld.com was founded in 2003 to cover theater news. As of September 2018, the website had a readership of 5.5 million monthly online visitors and an Alexa PageRank of 16,156 worldwide. The site also produces annual fan-voted awards and competitions related to various types of production.

In 2020, the site underwent a major redesign, and which included the creation of new sections, such as the Theatre Shop, Online Education, BroadwayWorld Research, and Industry Pro.

BroadwayWorld added a pay transparency rule to its job site in March 2021 due to the advocacy of On Our Team and Costume Professionals for Wage Equity.

For its 20th anniversary in 2023, BroadwayWorld held a gala at Sony Hall, Manhattan, hosted by Chita Rivera and Richard Ridge, with funds raised going to the charity Broadway Cares/Equity Fights AIDS. The Mayor of New York City, Eric Adams, officially proclaimed May 21, 2023 as BroadwayWorld Day.

=== 2025 ===
As of 2025, BroadwayWorld is the largest theater site on the internet, and covers 100 cities in the US as well as 45 countries. It is published in 12 languages. The site is focused on live entertainment, including that which appears on screen, and covers music, concerts, opera, dance, classical music and stage performances of all kinds. It has interviews, features, a message board, and various content for professionals as well as audiences. Its content is all original and aims to be accurate and free of bias.

It has regional sections on the website, with regions of the United States (Northeast, Midwest, South, and West); the rest of North America; Australia / New Zealand; Europe / UK; South America; Asia; Africa / Middle East. Each of these sections is further split into cities or countries, with appropriate dedicated coverage.

The Wikipedia community considers BroadwayWorld an unreliable source of information, as part of a group of sources that "allow clients to pay for coverage, run press releases or other user-generated content with little oversight, or operate essentially as partisan forums for activists of various political stripes".

== Awards ==
BroadwayWorld hosts various awards nominated by the users of the website, including BroadwayWorld Regional Awards Worldwide.

=== New York ===
The Annual Theatre Fans' Choice Awards are focused on New York productions. In 2020, for the 18th edition of the awards, participants were asked to vote for their choices in productions of the previous decade. The award is "the only major theatrical prize awarded solely by votes cast online by audience members".

=== UK awards ===
BroadwayWorld has a UK / West End section, devoted to British theatre and in particular productions in London's West End.

The UK / West End BroadwayWorld Awards (or BroadwayWorld UK / West End Awards) are awarded each year, based on online voting. In 2024, there were 24 categories in the awards.
