= Irene Hedlund =

Danish illustrator and children's writer (born 1947)

- Born: March 8, 1947; Denmark
- Education: Danish Design School (graduated 1982)
- Occupations: Illustrator, children's writer
- Notable work: Mighty Mountain and the Three Strong Women, Den grådige kat, Da Oscar blev tosset
- Spouse: Bent Faurby

Irene Hedlund (born 8 March 1947) is a Danish book illustrator and children's writer. Since 1981 she has illustrated books by popular Danish authors such as Thøger Birkeland and Klaus Rifbjerg. In addition to writing and illustrating her own books, she has designed signs and posters for LEGO, the Danish Bibliographic Centre and the Danish Road Safety Council.

== Biography ==
Born on 8 March 1947, Hedlund attended the Danish Design School in Copenhagen, graduating in 1982. Her first published illustrations were in Thøger Birkeland's Rasmus og Hængekøjen in 1981 which she managed to complete in just one month. In 1983, as author of Evige Bjerg og de tre stærke kvinder, she gave herself a whole year to create the illustrations to her satisfaction. The Japanese story is aptly enhanced with illustrations containing bamboo, mountrains and gnarled trees. Decorative frames add to the attractiveness of her pictures.

Her illustrations in Klaus Rifbjerg's Da Oscar blev tosset (1990) about a child's first tentative experiences of kindergarten present an initially frightening but subsequently more relaxed account of how he eventually fits in. The overall effect is to present a more welcoming environment for children confronted with the prospect of going to kindergarten.

Other notable examples of her work are to be seen in Den grådige kat (The Greedy Cat, 1988) about a cat which eats everything in sight and Den arrige kone (The Angry Wife, 1986) which tells the story of a pig keeper who has to dispose of his mad wife if he is to live a happy life. Both stories are written and illustrated by Hedlund.

Building on her own difficulties in learning to read, in 1991 Hedlund illustrated Lærke og Jeppe - året rundt (Lærke and Jeppe - All Year Round) written by her husband Bent Faurby. Her illustrations resemble comic strips although the text takes the form of a real book, increasing the appeal for young readers. The images themselves point to the sections of text which provide the necessary background to the evolving story.

== Selected publications ==
Hedlund has illustrated a wide variety of children's books. The following have been published in English:

- Berliner, Franz; Hedlund, Irene (1989). Miserable Marabou. Gareth Stevens Pub. ISBN 978-0-8368-0094-4.
- Hedlund, Irene (1990). Mighty Mountain and the Three Strong Women. Volcano Press/Kazan Books. ISBN 978-0-912078-86-1.
- Hedlund, Irene (1994). Virgo. Chobham: Forum.
- Hedlund, Irene (1994). Leo. Chobham: Forum.
- Hedlund, Irene (1994). Gemini. Chobham: Forum.
- Hedlund, Irene (1994). You and Your Star Signs. Abe Books. ISBN 9781872081090.
