= Sound Credit =

Music media sharing and data collection software

- Developer: Sound Credit
- Initial release: 2017
- Written in: C++, PHP/Laravel, Python, Dart
- Operating system: Microsoft Windows, macOS, Android, iOS
- Platform: Desktop, Mobile, Tablet, Web Browser
- Available in: English
- License: Proprietary
- Website: soundcredit.com

Sound Credit is a music collaboration, media sharing, and data collection platform for creators, with computer software applications for web browsers, Windows Desktop, macOS Desktop, iOS, and Android. It includes the Sound Credit cross-platform application.

Sound Credit is used in the music industry through multimodal interaction, with a free user profile option including identifier code generation, data entry and editing software developed for information quality (IQ). It also functions as a data hub and exporter for data transmission throughout the music industry supply chain for royalty payment and attribution purposes.

Music credits are loaded and saved into Sound Credit's DDEX RIN format implementation, as the first software available to the public with this capability. As of 2019, Sound Credit was included with Pro Tools subscriptions.

== History ==
Sound Credit was originally released under the brand Soundways RIN-M. Soundways later renamed as Soundways dba Sound Credit. RIN-M was renamed as the Sound Credit Tracker plug-in during the platform expansion.

In 2019, Sound Credit partnered with Phonographic Performance Limited (PPL), a British music copyright collective, for an International Performer Number (IPN) integration as part of its cloud profile services.

Sound Credit also partnered with Avid Technologies, the makers of Pro Tools, and the Sound Credit platform applications are included with Pro Tools subscriptions.

In July 2020, Sound Credit partnered to become an ISO International Standard Name Identifier (ISNI) Registration Agency, and released the first fully automated ISNI Registration feature as part of its cloud profile services.

Sound Credit was noted as being used in the delivery of credits and information on Blake Shelton's release God's Country to Warner Music. The release received a GRAMMY Award nomination in 2020 and won Single of the Year for the 2019 Country Music Association (CMA) Awards.

== Features and usage ==
=== Sound Credit Application ===
The Sound Credit application is cross-platform software for Windows, macOS, Android, and iOS allowing users to manage media, share media, enter, edit, and export music data. This software is the primary application of the platform. Sound Credit runs natively on desktop computers.

==== Primary Features ====
- Cloud-based file storage, synchronization and access-controlled sharing
- Comprehensive metadata entry for all recording and composition data
- Publishing "Splits" data management
- ISNI (International Standard Name Identifier) Registration and Lookup
- ISRC (International Standard Recording Code) Generator
- GRid (Global Release Identifier) Generator
- PRO (Performance Rights Organization) Registration for ASCAP, BMI, and SOCAN
- Native DDEX RIN export
- CD insert and vinyl sleeve exports
- Mastering workstation export (Magix Samplitude/Sequoia and Steinberg WaveLab)
- Dozens of other export formats including draft label copy formats specific to many companies
- Single-window user interface with nested menus, fully scalable
- Incremental search

=== Sound Credit Mobile App ===
The Sound Credit mobile app allows media uploading, sharing, data entry, and profile management.

- Android
- iOS

=== Sound Credit Tracker Plug-in ===
The Sound Credit Tracker was a plug-in that worked with digital audio workstation (DAW) software, including Garage Band, Logic, Nuendo, Sequoia, Wavelab, Cubase and Pro Tools. This has been discontinued.

- VST, AU and AAX plug-in format support
- BWAV embedding of Artist Name, Song Name and ISRC Codes

=== Sound Credit Kiosk ===
The Sound Credit kiosk was a standalone system for checking-in to music recording sessions. This has been discontinued.

- Magnetic stripe card support
- Barcode reader support

== Investment Backing ==
Sound Credit is a C Corporation based in the United States. It is one of approximately 100 companies backed by the Revolution Fund, led by Steve Case and which lists LPs including Jeff Bezos, Michael Bloomberg, Meg Whitman and others. Sound Credit is also backed by investment from US-based venture capital firm, Innova Capital. Sound Credit was founded and engaged in Techstars Global Accelerator Network accelerator program, StartCo.

Sound Credit CEO and Co-founder, Gebre Waddell, appeared in 2019 on 60 Minutes in an episode about the Revolution Fund's investment in Sound Credit.

== Reception ==
Sound Credit won the Rise of the Rest venture capital investment competition in 2018.

In 2019, Sound Credit was voted as a NAMM Show TEC Awards nominee. Sound Credit was the first music credits software to be nominated for a TEC award.

Sound Credit appeared at the 2019 Creator Credits Summit in Stockholm hosted by Spotify, and the 2020 Creator Credits Summit.

Sound Credit was also featured at Recording Academy/GRAMMY Membership Celebrations in Portland, Oregon, and Houston, Texas.
