= Bent Faurby =

Danish author and schoolteacher (born 1937)

- Born: 21 March 1937 (age 89); Kolding, Denmark
- Occupations: Author; schoolteacher
- Spouse: Irene Hedlund
- Writing career
- Genre: Children's literature

Bent Faurby (born 21 March 1937) is a Danish author and schoolteacher who has specialized in children's literature, writing both fiction and informative works covering a variety of subjects.

== Biography ==
Born in Kolding, Faurby attended Silkeborg Seminarium (teacher training college) where he received his diploma in 1960. In 1962, he took up a teaching assignment in Upernavik in northwest Greenland which later led to two factual books about Greenland in 1996. Faurby got his first book published in 1976.

His many reading books and easy readers for children and young people address everything from footballers to snakes. His work includes reader-friendly literature in the areas of history, geography and biology. Attractive Danish topics he has written about include Tordenskjold, the Øresund Link, pirates and sharks. Some of his books combine fact and fiction as in Toms rejse til Island (Tom's Trip to Iceland) which contains much information about volcanos and geysers. It is one of 12 in his popular Tom series, illustrated by his wife Irene Hedlund.

Faurby, who received the Skriverpris for læservenligt forfatterskab (Award for Reader-Friendly Writing) in 1998, lives in Højbjerg, a southern district of Aarhus. He is married to the Danish illustrator and children's writer Irene Hedlund who has illustrated many of his books.
