= Timo Hannay =

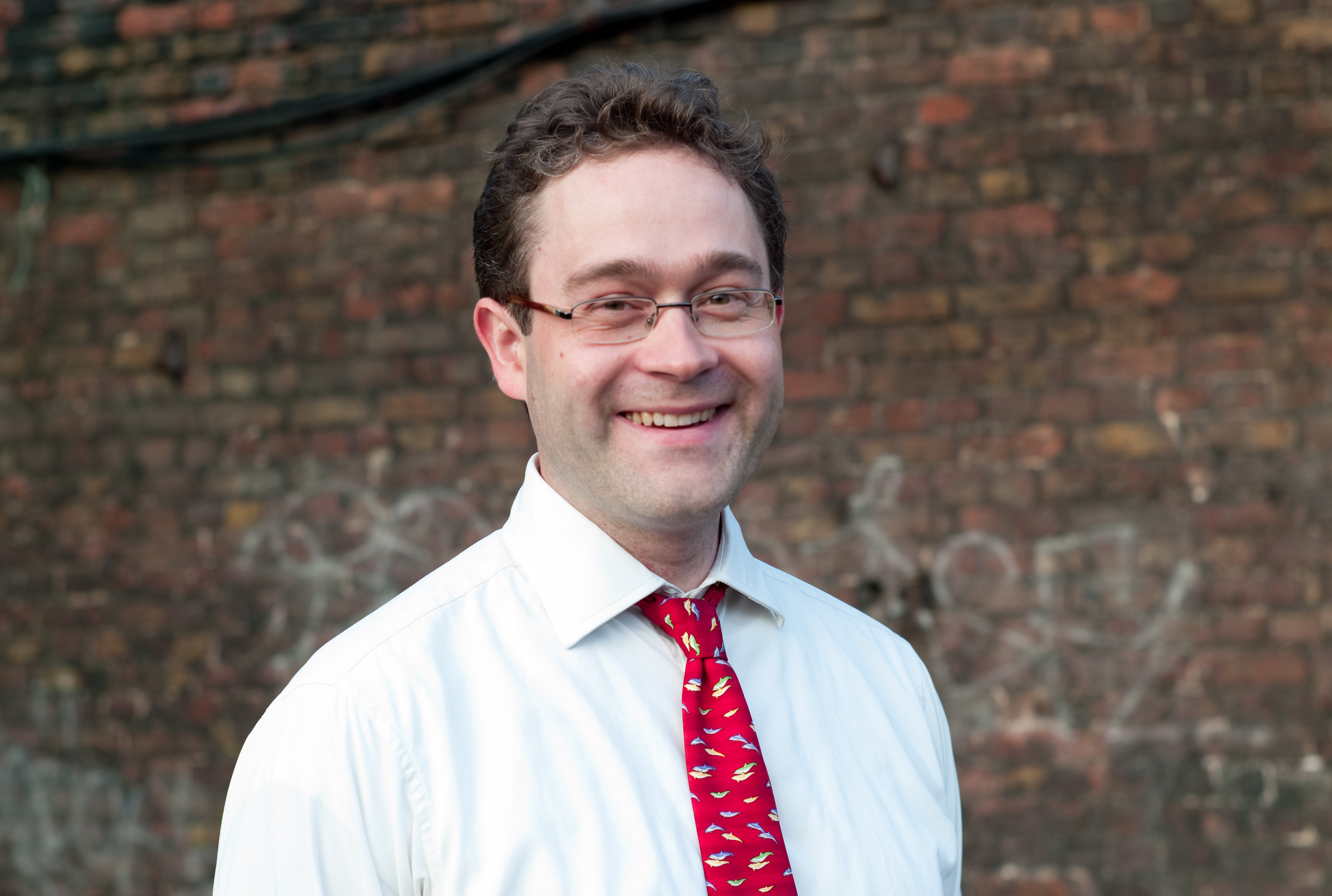
- Timo Hannay in 2009
- Born: Robert Timo Hannay; 1968 (age 57–58)
- Citizenship: British
- Education: Imperial College London (BSc); University of Oxford (DPhil)
- Known for: Digital Science; Connotea; Science Foo Camp; SchoolDash.com
- Awards: Webby Nominee (2009); Webby Award (2008); ALPSP Award for Publishing Innovation (2005)
- Scientific career
- Workplaces: School Dash Ltd.; SAGE Publications; Write LaTeX Ltd.; Symplectic Ltd.; Digital Science; Nature Publishing Group; The Economist; McKinsey & Company
- Thesis: Quantal analysis of synaptic plasticity in the rat hippocampus (1994)
- Doctoral advisor: Alan Larkman
- Website: schooldash.com/about.html

(Robert) Timo Hannay (born 1968) is the founding Managing Director of School Dash Limited, an education technology company based in London. Prior to SchoolDash, Hannay was the founding managing director of Digital Science in London, United Kingdom where he ran the company from its foundation in 2010 until 2015. Digital Science was founded to provide software and services aimed at scientific researchers and research administrators. Prior to Digital Science, he worked for Nature, which was owned by Macmillan Publishers until the merger of Springer and Macmillan to form Springer Nature in 2015.

== Education ==
Hannay was educated at Imperial College London where he graduated with a Bachelor of Science degree in Biochemistry. He went on to complete a Doctor of Philosophy degree at the University of Oxford which was awarded for his research in neuroplasticity of the hippocampus of laboratory rats from the supervised by Alan Larkman in 1994.

== Career ==
As of 2017 Hannay is a non-executive director of SAGE Publications and director of School Dash Limited. He was previously a director of Write Latex Limited (creators of the LaTeX editor overleaf.com) and Symplectic Limited.

Hannay has worked at The Economist and as a management consultant at McKinsey & Company in Japan and joined Nature's Tokyo office in 1998. He moved to London in 2000.

Hannay is a recognized expert on online publishing, web-enabled science and social bookmarking. He was the publishing director of Web Publishing at Nature Publishing Group, managing Nature.com, naturejobs.com, natureevents.com, Nature Methods and Nature Protocols. In addition to his work at Nature, he was the co-organiser, with Tim O'Reilly and Chris DiBona of Science Foo Camp.

=== Awards and honours ===
Hannay was awarded the Association of Learned and Professional Society Publishers (ALPSP) award for innovation in publishing in 2005 and a Webby Award in 2008. Hannay was depicted by Jorge Cham in the Piled Higher and Deeper webcomic titled Nature vs Science vs Open Access.
