= Laurel Haak =

American neuroscientist

- Employer: ORCID, Inc. (2012–2020)

Laurel L. Haak, known as Laure, was the founding Executive Director (2012-2020) of ORCID, an international non-profit which generates and maintains unique identifiers for individuals to participate in the research lifecycle.

Haak received BS and MS degrees in Biology from Stanford University in 1988. She received her doctorate in neurosciences from the Stanford University School of Medicine in 1997.

Haak served as a postdoctoral fellow at the National Institutes of Health, as editor and manager of the Postdoctoral Network for Science's Next Wave, and as Chief Science Officer at Discovery Logic, an IT startup company later acquired by Thomson Reuters. In 2012, she was the first person appointed to the Executive Director and CEO role at ORCID, and served as its Executive Director until 2020. As of 2020, Haak is the Founder and CEO of Mighty Red Barn, a consultancy that specializes in research infrastructure. Laure was a Research Scholar at the Ronin Institute from 2020-2024.

She has received the following awards:

- Distinguished Service Award, National Postdoctoral Association (2006)
- Director's Award, National Institutes of Health (2009)
- Award for Excellence in Mentoring, Association for Women in Science Bethesda chapter (2007)
- Medal of Honour, Vietsch Foundation (2021)
- Fellow, American Association for the Advancement of Science (2023)
