= ISO/IEC 7064 =

ISO/IEC standard

ISO/IEC 7064 is a standard promulgated by the International Standards Organization (ISO) and International Electrotechnical Commission (IEC) that defines algorithms for calculating check digit characters. The checks should be applicable to alphanumeric strings and should be able to detect all single substitution errors, all or nearly all single local transposition errors, all or nearly all circular shift errors, a high proportion of double substitution errors, and a high proportion of all other errors.

== Standards ==
- Status: Published - ISO/IEC 7064:2003 Information technology — Security techniques — Check character systems
- Status: Withdrawn - ISO 7064:1983 Data processing — Check character systems

== Usage ==
It is referred to by other ISO standards:

- International Bank Account Number (IBAN)
- International Standard Text Code (ISTC)
- International Standard Name Identifier (ISNI)
- Legal Entity Identifier (LEI)

and by other systems:

- Personal identification number (Croatia)
- Resident Identity Card (People's Republic of China)
- Global Release Identifier
- ORCID
