= Gebre Waddell =

American entrepreneur, author, and engineer (born 1981)

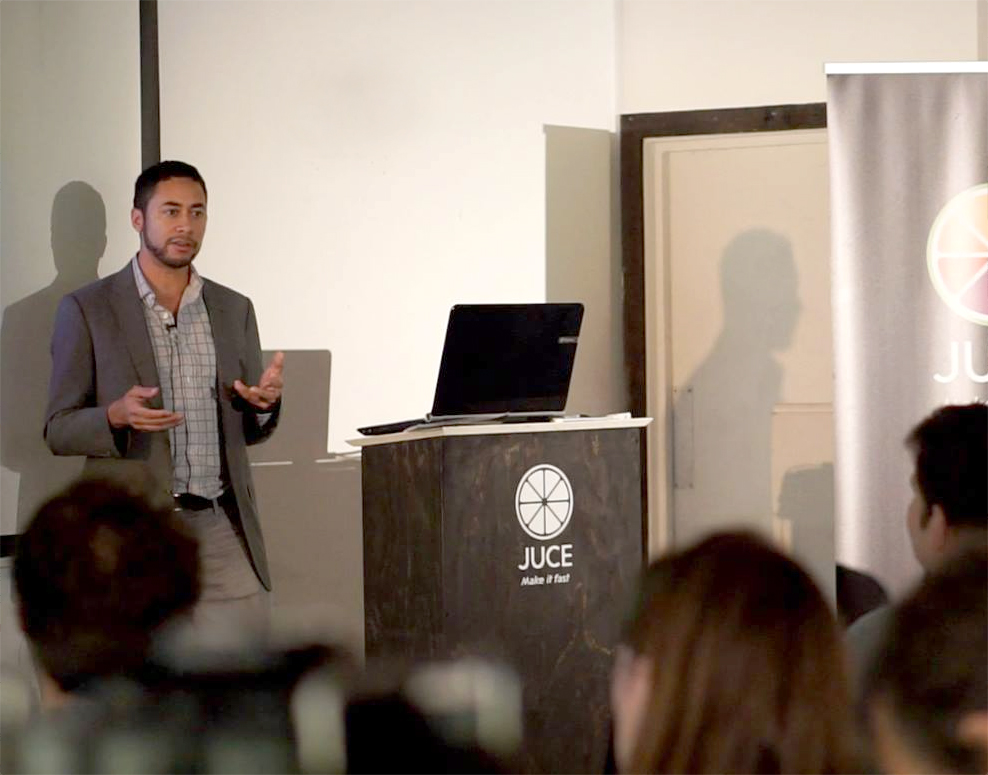
- Gebre Waddell at JUCE Summit, London
- Born: November 28, 1981
- Occupations: Entrepreneur, audio engineer, author

Gebre Waddell (born November 28, 1981) is an American entrepreneur, author, audio engineer, and software engineer from Memphis, Tennessee.

He is the chief executive officer and co-founder of Sound Credit and the author of Complete Audio Mastering: Practical Techniques published by McGraw-Hill. He has worked with artists including Ministry, Lil' Wayne, Rick Ross, Public Enemy and The Bar-Kays.

== Early life ==
Waddell was born in Memphis, Tennessee, into a family with a history of involvement in the civil rights movement. His father, James Waddell Jr, a sculptor, created the first-ever sculpture of Dr. Martin Luther King Jr. Lucious Matthews, Waddell's uncle, was prominently featured in several significant photographs from the civil rights movement.

Waddell attended the University of Memphis, earning a degree in Accounting and Music.

== Career ==
=== Entrepreneurship and Industry ===
In March 2024 the State of Tennessee enacted the Ensuring Likeness, Voice, and Image Security Act, also known as the ELVIS Act, the first U.S. state bill regulating artificial intelligence with a focus on publicity rights. Drawing on his expertise in attribution, gained through his work with Sound Credit, Waddell played a pivotal role in the origination of this legislation, personally drafting its initial version.

In June 2023, Waddell was elected as one of the four national officers of the Recording Academy/GRAMMYs, together with Tammy Susan Hurt (chair), Dr. Chelsey Green (vice chair), and Christine Albert (chair emeritus), in the role of Secretary/Treasurer of the Board of Trustees.

In February 2023, Waddell, as founder and CEO of Sound Credit, announced a $30 million advance facility from the GRAMMY red carpet in Los Angeles, and a partnership with UK-based music licensing company PPL aimed at enhancing international royalty collection services for American performers.

In 2020, Waddell was elected to the national Board of Trustees of the Recording Academy/GRAMMYs which includes Yolanda Adams, John Legend, PJ Morton and others comprising the 40-seat board. He was also appointed by Tennessee Governor Bill Lee to the Tennessee Entertainment Commission in late 2019 and was later appointed as chairman of the board.

Waddell appeared with supermodel Karlie Kloss in 2020 for the CSForAll Commitments Summit, for a discussion around the expansion of access to computer science education.

On March 17, 2019, Waddell appeared on 60 Minutes, in a feature on the Revolution Fund and its investment in Sound Credit. It also covered the connections fostered by Revolution between industry leaders such as Eric Schmidt of Google and their consulting with entrepreneurs in the fund.

In 2018, Waddell was one of eight winners of the Revolution Fund's Rise of the Rest tour and funding for seed stage capital. The Revolution Fund investors include Jeff Bezos, Jim Breyer and Eric Schmidt, and its funding of Sound Credit was matched by VC, Innova Capital. Later that year, Inside Memphis Business magazine selected Waddell as 2018 Innovator of the Year.

In 2016, Waddell became co-founder and chief executive officer of Sound Credit (Soundways), a music industry technology corporation based in Memphis, TN.

In 2013, Waddell developed Refinement, an audio processor for controlling the sensation of harshness in audio signals, and licensed it to Brainworx Germany, who then developed a commercial product called bx_refinement (based on the Refinement prototype). Brainworx sells bx_refinement via Plugin Alliance and Universal Audio. bx_Refinement was released in 2014 as the first audio plugin simultaneously released across the Plugin Alliance and UAD platforms.

Waddell released a multi-sampled software instrument named ReasonRhodes that mimicked the classic Fender Rhodes piano. ReasonRhodes was featured on the cover of Keyboard magazine in 2006, together with a story that covered Waddell's work in developing the instrument.

=== Audio engineering ===
Waddell was elected President of the Recording Academy Memphis Chapter in 2017. He was elected to the Recording Academy Memphis Chapter Board of Governors in 2016, and became a co-chair of the Producers & Engineers Wing.

In 2013, "Complete Audio Mastering: Practical Techniques", authored by Gebre Waddell was published by McGraw-Hill Professional.

Waddell created a printed frequency chart in 2010 that displays the frequency energy of common musical instruments with standardized spectrograms. The spectrograms were created from recordings of each instrument playing each note of their range. The print, titled The Frequency Domain is now found in studios and institutions including Stanford University, Harvard University, and in the office of audio icon, Rupert Neve.

He received his first breaks with a project produced by John Tesh in 2005, and Public Enemy in 2006 on their album, "How You Sell Soul to a Soulless People Who Sold Their Soul".

In 2003, Waddell established a mastering studio, Stonebridge Mastering, located in downtown Memphis, TN.

=== Boards and organizations ===
- National Board of Trustees, Recording Academy / GRAMMYS
- Tennessee State Office, TN Entertainment Commission
- Innovator of the Year, Inside Memphis Business (2018)
- Chapter President, The Recording Academy / GRAMMY Memphis Chapter (2017–19)
- Board of Directors, Smithsonian Rock and Soul Museum (2018–19)
- Tennessee State Office, TN Interactive Digital Media Council (2017-)
- Board of Directors, Roots & American Music Society (2016-)
