= Science Foo Camp =

Annual unconference

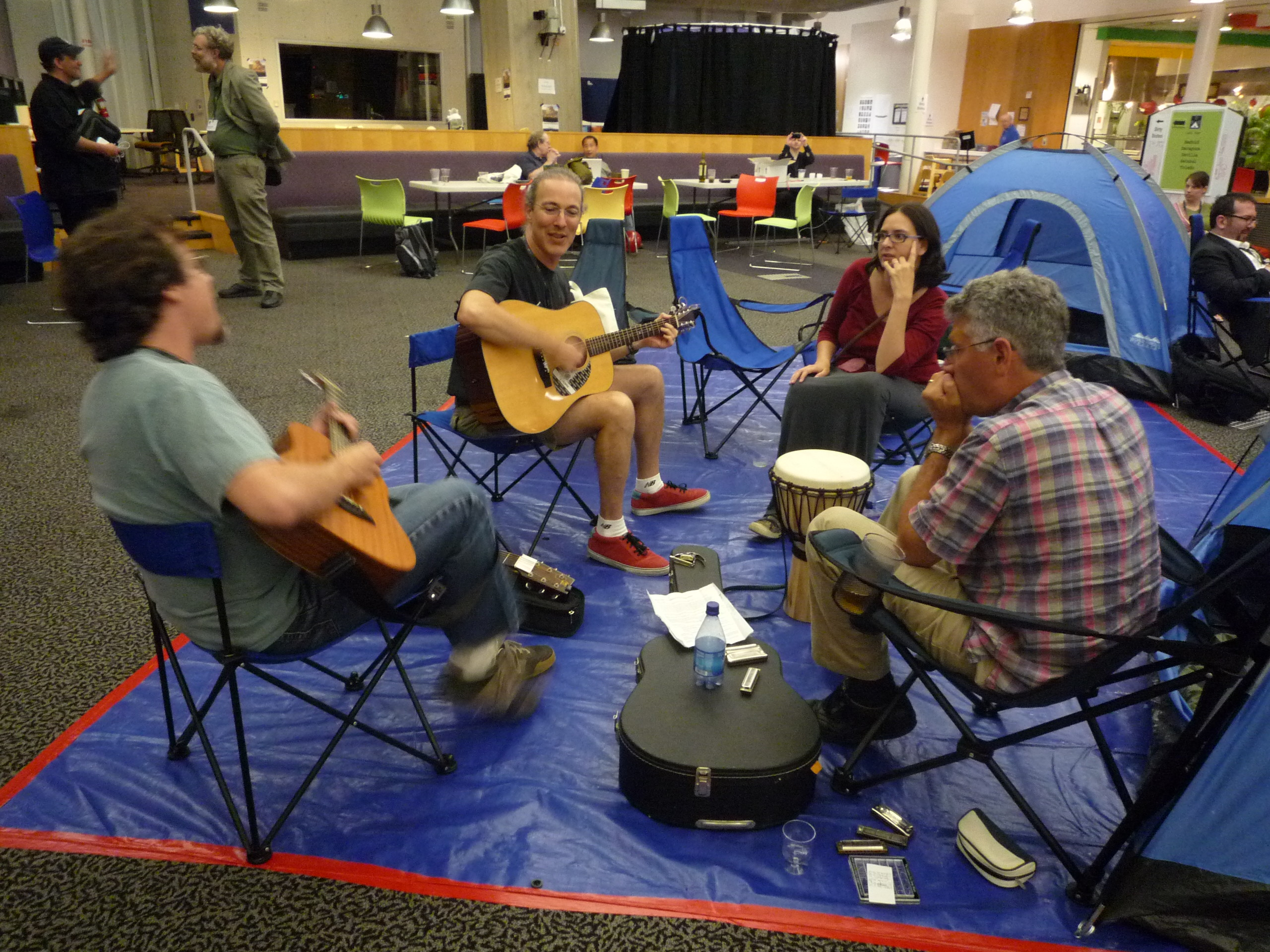
- Some delegates at Science Foo Camp in 2009
- Venue: Googleplex
- Location: Mountain View, California
- Type: Foo Camp; Unconference
- Theme: Interdisciplinary
- Organised by: Google; Digital Science; O'Reilly Media
- Website: www.digital-science.com/resource/scifoo

Science Foo Camp (scifoo) is an annual interdisciplinary scientific unconference organized by O'Reilly Media, Digital Science, and Alphabet Inc., based on an idea from Linda Stone. Inspired by Foo Camp, a conference on emerging technology, Science Foo Camp intentionally fosters collaboration between scientists who would not typically work together. It differs from conventional conferences in three main ways: attendance is by invitation-only, delegates come from a large variety of scientific disciplines rather than one subject, and attendees set the conference program during the conference itself based on shared interests rather than follow a set agenda.

The first event in 2006 was held under the Chatham House Rule. The policy at the second event was to allow open reporting by default; attendees were expected to indicate if their comments were off the record. Science Foo Camp has taken place annually at the Googleplex campus in Mountain View, California, United States. In 2024, SciFoo was held for the first time outside of the US. It took place 26–28 July 2024 in Cambridge, UK.

== Organization ==
As of 2022, Sci Foo is organized in collaboration by four organizations: Tim O'Reilly and Marsee Henon of O'Reilly Media (FOO stands for "Friends of O'Reilly"), Daniel Hook and Amarjit Myers of Digital Science, Magdalena Skipper of Nature, and Cat Allman of Digital Science (formerly Google).

Previously Timo Hannay and Chris DiBona were also hosts and organizers.

== See also ==
- Science Hack Day
