= Global Research Identifier Database =

Database of educational and research organizations

GRID; Global Research Identifier Database
- Website type: Research database
- Available in: English
- Owner: Digital Science
- Creator: Digital Science
- Website: www.grid.ac
- Registration: No
- Launched: 2015; 11 years ago
- Current status: Active
- Content licence: Creative Commons CC0

Global Research Identifier Database (GRID) is a database of educational and research organizations worldwide, created and maintained by Digital Science & Research Solutions Ltd., part of the technology company Digital Science. In 2021 public releases of the database were discontinued in favor of Research Organization Registry (ROR) as the leading open organization identifier.

Each organization is assigned a unique GRID ID, and there is a corresponding web address and page for each ID in the database. The dataset contains the institution's type, geo-coordinates, official website, and Wikipedia page. Name variations of institutions are included, as well.

The first public release of GRID occurred on 22 September 2015, and it contained entries for 47,648 institutes. The 30th public release of GRID was on 27 August 2018, and the database contained 89,506 entries. It is available in the Resource Description Framework (RDF) specification as linked data, and can therefore be linked to other data. Containing 14,401 relationships, GRID models two types of relationships: a parent-child relationship that defines a subordinate association, and a related relationship that describes other associations

In December 2016, Digital Science released GRID under a Creative Commons CC0 licence — without restriction under copyright or database law.

The database is available for download as a ZIP archive, which includes the entire database in JSON and CSV file formats.

From all the sources from which it draws information, including funding datasets, Digital Science claims that GRID covers 92% of institutions.

== Data sources ==
Partial list of data sources, as listed in Wikidata and grid.ac/downloads (in alphabetical order)
Name	Relation
Centre national de la recherche scientifique (CNRS)	France
Crossref	United States (U.S.) and United Kingdom (UK)
European Tertiary Education Register (ETER)	European Union (EU)
GeoNames	Switzerland
Grant data from Estonia	Estonia
Grant data from Slovakia	Slovakia
Grant data from United States	U.S.
Higher Education Statistics Agency (HESA) institution codes	UK
Index of American Universities	U.S.
International Standard Name Identifier (ISNI)	UK
Nomenclature of Territorial Units for Statistics (NUTS)	EU
ORCID iD (Open Researcher and Contributor ID)	U.S.
OrgRef	UK
Universities and Colleges Admissions Service (UCAS)	UK
Russian Academy of Sciences (RAS)	Russia
Wikidata identifier	

== Example ==
The GRID ID for NASA: → grid.238252.c.
