= Digital Science =

UK technology company serving the needs of scientific and research communities

- Type: Subsidiary
- Industry: Technology
- Founded: 2010; 16 years ago
- Founder: Timo Hannay
- Headquarters: London, England
- Key people: Daniel W. Hook (CEO, 2015-present)
- Products: Altmetric | Global Research Identifier Database | Dimensions
- Services: Research Management
- Number of employees: 250 (2017)
- Parent: Holtzbrinck Publishing Group
- Website: digital-science.com

Digital Science (or Digital Science & Research Solutions Ltd) is a technology company with its headquarters in London, England. The company focuses on strategic investments into startup companies that support the research lifecycle. Overleaf is a part of Digital Science.

== History ==
Digital Science was founded in 2010. It was initially the technical division of Nature Publishing Group/Macmillan and is now operated as an independent company by Holtzbrinck Publishing Group. They are one of the organizers of Science Foo Camp along with Nature, Google and O'Reilly.

Since 2013, Digital Science has released a number of collaborative reports using data generated from their portfolio companies featured in media outlets. The company worked with HEFCE and King's College London in 2015, following the inclusion of Research Impact in the Research Excellence Framework (REF), to analyse the results and provide access to the case studies to the public.

Digital Science launched a Global Research Identifier Database (GRID) for identifying research institutions around the world in 2015. Through the Digital Science Catalyst Grant the company has supported a number of early-stage ideas such as Nutonian, TetraScience and Penelope as well as community schemes including Ada Lovelace Day.

In 2013 it invested in UberResearch which launched "Dimensions" in 2016, a searchable database of research funds.

On 15 January 2018, Digital Science re-launched an extended version of Dimensions, a commercial scholarly search platform that allows to search publications, datasets, grants, patents and clinical trials. The free version of the platform allows searching for publications and datasets only.

Several studies published in 2021 compared Dimensions with its subscription-based commercial competitors, and unanimously found that Dimensions.ai provides broader temporal and publication source coverage than Scopus and Web of Science in most subject areas, and that Dimensions is closer in its coverage to free aggregation databases, such as The Lens and Google Scholar.

As of October 2021, Dimensions.ai covers nearly 106 million publications with over 1.2 billion citations.

== Key people ==
- From 2010 to 2015, Timo Hannay was Managing Director
- From 2013 to 2015, Amy Brand held the role of VP academic & research relations before moving to become Director of MIT Press.
- From 2015 to 2026, Daniel W. Hook was Chief Executive Officer.
- Steven Leicht took over as Chief Executive Officer in August 2026.

== Catalyst Grant Winners ==
Company	Cohort	Description
Ricochet by Ripeta	September 2017	The credit score for scientific publications that can detect and predict reproducibility in the trillion-dollar scientific research industry through software and analytics development; improving evidence-based science and fiscal efficiency of research investments.
Open Syllabus Project	September 2017	Software that collates and maps the college and university curriculum, on a global scale.
fusemind.org	September 2017	A search tool that gives students and researchers instant access to millions of research resources, within seconds, all on one platform.
Figures	March 2017	A workflow solution to manage figure data including creation, tracking, editing and discussion – all on one platform.
HackScience	March 2017	A platform enabling scientists to create, share and control open and affordable lab automation tools.
HipDynamics	March 2017	A data set interrogation tool in the field of cell and molecular biology.
Etalia	September 2016	A platform that offers recommendations for papers and people based on a unique fingerprint generated from a researcher’s reference library.
Simiary	September 2016	A software solution which boosts content discovery via intelligent search.
Writefull	September 2016	An online software application which provides editing and authoring guidance to enhance academic writing.
Ada Lovelace Day	September 2015	On the 200th anniversary of the birth of Ada Lovelace this year, Ada Lovelace Day and Digital Science will mark women’s achievements in science, technology, engineering and mathematics.
Penelope	September 2015	Automated, online editing tool aims to make it easier to assess and improve scientific research – wins award, backing and shared facilities with Digital Science.
TetraScience	January 2015	An open Internet-of-Things (IoT) platform to enhance productivity, safety and reproducibility in research.

== See also ==
- List of academic databases and search engines
