= Music ownership databases =

Lists of owners of musical compositions

Music ownership databases are lists of the owners of compositions and the people who represent them. Often, a piece of music will have more than one owner. This is caused by Publishing contracts, co-writing, band contracts, label deals, and similar music contracts. Music ownership databases are created from the idea that with more transparency about the owners of musical compositions, the lower the costs become to create and use music. For example, a derivative license is needed when a portion of a piece of music is used in a different piece, which is a common practice in hip hop music, among other genres. In American copyright laws, a derivative work must have permission from every owner of the original work. If it is not known who the original owner of the work was and artists use it anyway, then they can be sued for copyright infringement. A music ownership database, major industry players speculate, would eliminate this problem. This is apparent through the amount of time and money spent in attempting to create this database.

== Earlier attempts ==
=== International Music Joint Venture ===
The International Music Joint Venture (IMJV) started in 1998. It was the first joint partnership to create a database between multiple different collective management organizations (CMOs). BUMA/STEMRA (Netherland), PRS (UK) and ASCAP (USA) were the founders. The database was supposed to be created using the metadata stored on Utrecht and London computers. IMJV invited many CMOs like SGAE (Spain), BMI (USA) and Harry Fox Agency, but for one reason or another many organizations did not join. Problems started to rise because IMJV was a way for STEMRA to move around employees they could not fire because of the laws in Holland at the time. When IMJV invited GEMA (Germany), they refused because they would have to fire their staff because the deal required STEMRA staff to take their place. Smaller CMOs started to believe that they would become redundant if IMJV launched. The larger CMOs who had already joined became reluctant to reduce their status and profitability by releasing the information for their repertoire. In late 2001, the initiative dissolved without a single operating office. At its peak, IMJV represented 21% of the world's music.

=== International Music Registry ===
In 2011, the International Music Registry (IMR) launched. This was a database headed by the World Intellectual Property Organization (WIPO). IMR was a database not only for composition but also for recordings. Google agreed to fund WIPO early on, but WIPO broke their partnership after they thought the alliance would give Google too much power. Instead, WIPO tried to fund the project themselves. In-fighting among the different powerhouses like record labels and publishing houses caused the IMR to collapse.

=== Global Repertoire Database ===
The Global Repertoire Database was started by the PRS in September 2008. This database had representatives from publishing houses, record labels, Google, iTunes, Monifone, and had a total of 13 CMO's: APRA (Australasia), ASCAP, BMI, BUMA, GEMA, PRS, STIM (Sweden), SACEM (France), SOCAN (Canada), SABAM (Belgium), SGAE, SIAE (Italy) and UBC (Brazil). More than 80 organizations participated in the initiative. This database was never meant to be for public use, but as a Global Database for music industry major players. Due to some CMOs pulling their support from the initiative, GRD went from having guaranteed financial support to having 8 million euros of investment scrapped.

== Current American attempts ==
=== Transparency of Music License Ownership Act ===
The Transparency of Music License Ownership Act bill was introduced to the United States House of Representatives on July 20, 2017, by Jim Sensenbrenner and Suzan DelBene. It creates a database with the ability to enforce participation by law. Like most legislation today, there are people who support this bill and people who oppose against this bill. The people who are in support after the Transparency of Music License Ownership Act say that it will help the music industry grow by cutting costs caused by misinformation and intermediaries. The opposition against this bill believes that the legislation would limit the ability for copyright owners to sue for infringement.

=== ASCAP and BMI Database ===
On July 26, 2017, ASCAP and BMI announced a joint database between both organizations, a project that has been in the works for the past year. The first phase, a searchable database, will roll out the first quarter of 2018. 90% of music in the USA is represented by these two organizations. Groups of people in that industry are excited for this much information to be on one database. At the same time, many have mentioned that the database is incomplete because it does not include music from the CMO SESAC (USA). House Representative Jim Sensenbrenner, among others in the industry, have suggested ASCAP and BMI cannot be trusted because of their past withdrawing from the GRD causing it to collapse.

=== RIAA and NMPA Database ===
Soon after ASCAP and BMI announced their database, RIAA and NMPA came forward with the information that they have also been working on the database between their two organizations. RIAA and NMPA said they purposely excluded ASCAP and BMI because they believed inviting them would cause a hindrance to the overall goal. At the same time, publishers in the music industry have expressed doubt about the ability of RIAA and NMPA to create a database without any CMOs.

== Current Tech Solutions ==
=== Blokur ===
Blokur, founded in 2017, has created a music copyright database to help music publishers get paid accurately through better rights data and music users to identify and clear rights. According to Blokur 70% of the music publishing sector uses Blokur to manage their rights and to benefit from automatic conflict reconciliation.
