= Research Organization Registry =

Community-led database of research institutions

- Owners: California Digital Library, Crossref and DataCite
- Website: ror.org
- Launched: 2019; 7 years ago
- Content license: CC0

Research Organization Registry (ROR) is a community-led dataset that aims to provide a persistent identifier for every research organization in the world. It complements other commonly used identifiers such as ORCID for researchers and DOI for research output.

Initially, the registry was seeded by the data from Global Research Identifier Database (GRID). In 2021 it was announced that ROR will take over the role of the leading open organization identifier from GRID. ROR's first release after separating from GRID was published in March 2022.

The data can be accessed via the official website, an open API, or as a downloadable data dump. All ROR IDs and metadata are provided under the CC0 license.
