= Dimensions (database) =

Bibliographic database

- Producer: Digital Science (international developers)

Access
- Cost: Free and Subscription

Coverage
- Disciplines: Life sciences; social sciences; physical sciences; health sciences
- Record depth: 106 million publications with over 1.2 billion citations openly accessible at
- Geospatial coverage: Worldwide

Links
- Website: app.dimensions.ai

Dimensions is a database of abstracts and citations and of research grants, which links grants to resulting publications, clinical trials and patents. Dimensions is part of Digital Science (or Digital Science & Research Solutions Ltd) - a technology company headquartered London, United Kingdom. The company focuses on strategic investments into startup companies, that support the research lifecycle.

Dimensions was launched in 2018. Some of its data is accessible free-of-charge at app.dimensions.ai.

== Coverage ==
As of July 2023, Dimensions.ai covers nearly 140 million publications with over 1.8 billion citations.

Two studies published in 2021 compared Dimensions with its subscription-based commercial competitors Scopus and Web of Science. The first study concluded based on 2010-2018 data, that Dimensions indexes three times more journals that Web of Science (excluding its Emerging Sources Citation Index), and almost twice as many as Scopus. The other study attempted to match citations in these three databases as well as Google Scholar and Microsoft Academic Graph, and found that Scopus and Dimensions are on par in terms of coverage, but smaller than Microsoft Academic Graph and Google Scholar.
