= Collaborative cataloging =

Collaborative cataloging is shared action of a group making bibliographic records available to its participants in order to prevent duplication of bibliographic records. Thus, cooperative cataloging has benefits such as cost effectiveness and availability of a ready cataloging model

Notable example of collaborative cataloging takes place at

- the National Transportation Library or NTL, which is administered by the U.S. Department of Transportation. NTL participates in a consortium called the National Transportation Knowledge Network (TKN), "which was establishe[d]… to help facilitate access to information in support of transportation development". Pursuing that goal, the TKN engages in cooperative cataloging with other transportation libraries. For example, in early summer 2011, the TKN held a meeting on cataloging standards that are used by transportation libraries nationwide.
- The Library of Congress with its Program for Cooperative Cataloging

More specifically, NTL uses cooperative cataloging to examine subject headings that are used in transportation literature. NTL is a key player in the organization of subject headings and has made significant contributions to the Transportation Research Thesaurus. The Transportation Research Thesaurus, or TRT, is a controlled vocabulary that was developed to improve the indexing and retrieval of transportation information. The TRT is used by indexers, content managers and librarians in the transportation community and is an internationally recognized standard.

== See also ==
- Cataloging (library science)
- Folksonomy
- Metatag
- Shared Cataloging Program (SCP)
