= International Standard Text Code =

Unique identifier for text-based works

The International Standard Text Code (ISTC) is a unique identifier for text-based works. The ISO standard was developed by TC 46/SC 9 and published in March 2009 as ISO 21047:2009.

The responsibility for implementing the standard was assigned to The International ISTC Agency. That agency ceased operations in 2017. Following a public call for a new organization to support the maintenance and registration of ISTC data, no other organizations stepped forward. A subsequent report produced by ISO TC 46/SC 9 on text identification, the ISTC standard was withdrawn from the ISO catalogue of standards in August 2021.

== Purpose ==
By including one or more ISTC numbers as an attribute of a bibliographic record (e.g., an ISBN record), the aggregation, collocation, filtering, etc. of publication records can be achieved automatically based on the content of the relevant publications. This solves the problem of identifying the relevant content when it is published under different titles, or where different content is published under the same title. The ISTC enables many improvements in efficiency, such as enabling retail websites to accurately re-use reviews and subject classifications applied to every publication of one work.

Another application involves using ISTCs to identify distinct but related works. E.g., the bibliographic records for a number of derivations, such as translations of the same work, can include the ISTC for that original work and thus be identified, even though the records are for publications of distinct works with separate titles.

== Implementation ==
A single database was used to hold all ISTC records. Anybody wishing to register a textual work, e.g., an author, agent or publisher, submitted a request to an ISTC registration agency with the necessary metadata. This enabled each registration request to be checked for global uniqueness. Unregistered works (those with unique metadata), a new ISTC number is returned, otherwise the existing ISTC number is returned. There is no concept of ownership of an ISTC number; the same number should be used by anyone wherever a work needs to be identified.

== Format ==
ISTC numbers are hexadecimal, so may be formed from numbers 0-9 and letters A-F. They are made up of four parts:

1. registry agency element - denotes which agency the work was registered through;
2. registration year element - denotes what year the work was registered in;
3. work element - 8 digit hexadecimal number, unique within year/agency;
4. check digit - calculated using a MOD 16-3 algorithm defined by ISO 7064.

Example: ISTC A02-2009-000004BE-A

== User manual ==
The ISTC User Manual is the official guide to the use of ISTCs; it is available for download free of charge from the International ISTC Agency's website.
