= Program for Cooperative Cataloging =

Library cataloging organization

The Program for Cooperative Cataloging is a collaborative cataloging program.

The formation of the Program for Cooperative Cataloging was catalyzed by an article by librarians Dorothy Gregor and Carol Mandel titled "Cataloging Must Change!", published in Library Journal in April 1991. Sarah Thomas, head of the Library of Congress's cataloging department, set up a series of meetings to respond to Gregor and Mandel's proposals. The Program for Cooperative Cataloging was one outcome of these meetings. It was founded in late 1994 or early 1995.

The program's purpose is to increase the speed and accessibility of producing bibliographic and authority records, and to reduce the associated cost. It has promoted the development of a "core" bibliographic record which contains all necessary data and accordingly reduces the need for editing.

Since the mid-2000s, the program has had four elements:

- Bibliographic Record Cooperative Program (BIBCO)
- Cooperative Online Serials Program (CONSER)
- Name Authority Cooperative Program (NACO), founded in 1977 by the Library of Congress as a standalone authority control program. In addition to the Library of Congress, the following libraries contribute to NACO: National Library of Mexico, British Library, Library and Archives Canada, National Agricultural Library (U.S.), National Library of Medicine (U.S.), National Library of New Zealand, National Library of Scotland, National Library of South Africa, National Library of Wales. NACO is one of the main contributors to the VIAF.
- Subject Authority Cooperative Program (SACO)
- Entity Management Cooperative Program (EMCO), launched in 2025 in an Early Adopters Phase.

Member libraries of the program submit records, which conform to a shared set of standards, for use by all other member libraries. Records are sent to the Library of Congress, which collects records on the program's behalf. A library may participate in some or all of these subcomponents; as of the early 2000s, NACO was the most popular.

== Sources ==
- Maxwell, Robert L. (2002). Maxwell's Guide to Authority Work. American Library Association. ISBN 0-8389-9908-5. OCLC 76865806.
