= Virtual International Authority File =

International authority file

- Acronym: VIAF
- Organisation: OCLC
- Introduced: 6 August 2003; 22 years ago
- Example: 106965171
- Website: viaf.org

The Virtual International Authority File (VIAF) is an international authority file. It is a joint project of several national libraries, operated by the Online Computer Library Center (OCLC).

== History ==
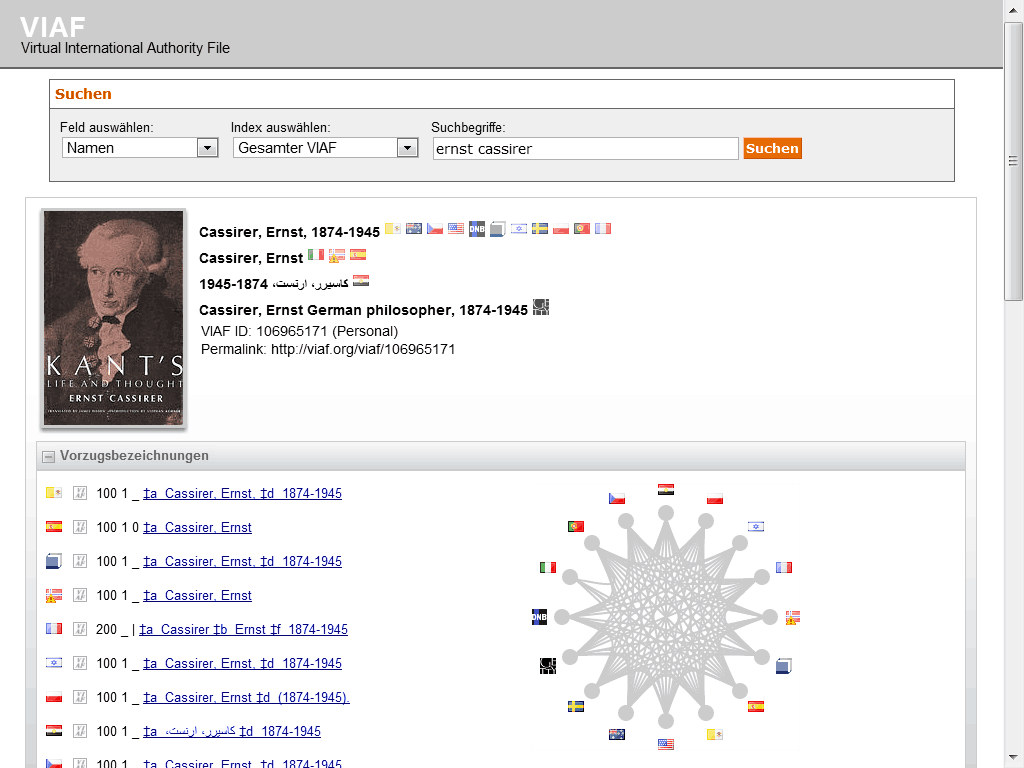
Homepage in 2012

Discussions about having a joint international authority started in the late 1990s. After several failed attempts to develop a unique joint authority file, the new idea was to link existing national authorities. This would present all the benefits of a standard file without requiring a significant investment of time and expense in the process.

The project was initiated by the American Library of Congress (LC), the German National Library (DNB), and the OCLC in April 1998 as a proof-of-concept that authority records can be linked. After extensive testing, the VIAF consortium was formed at the 2003 World Library and Information Congress, hosted by the International Federation of Library Associations. on 6 August 2003, and by September it had its own page at the OCLC website. The Bibliothèque nationale de France (BnF) joined the project on 5 October 2007.

The project transitioned to being a service of OCLC on 4 April 2012.

The aim is to link the national authority files (such as the German Integrated Authority File) to a single virtual authority file. In this file, identical records from the different data sets are linked together. A VIAF record receives a standard data number, contains the primary "see" and "see also" records from the original documents, and refers to the original authority records. The data is made available online and is available for research and, data exchange and sharing. Reciprocal updating uses the Open Archives Initiative Protocol for Metadata Harvesting (OAI-PMH) protocol.

The file numbers are also being added to Wikipedia biographical articles and are incorporated into Wikidata.

Christine L. Borgman groups VIAF with the International Standard Name Identifier and ORCID systems, describing all three as "loosely coordinated efforts to standardize name forms". Borgman characterizes all three systems as attempts to solve the problem of author name disambiguation, which has grown in scale as the quantity of data multiplies. She notes that VIAF, unlike the other two systems, is led by libraries, as opposed to individual authors or creators.

== VIAF clusters ==
VIAF's clustering algorithm is run every month. As more data are added from participating libraries, clusters of authority records may coalesce or split, leading to some fluctuation in the VIAF identifier of certain authority records.

== Participating libraries and organizations ==
| English Wikipedia entry name | Identifier | Native-language name | Location | Country/Region |
|---|---|---|---|---|
| National Library of Argentina | ARBABN | Spanish: Biblioteca Nacional Mariano Moreno | Buenos Aires | Argentina |
| Bibliotheca Alexandrina | EGAXA | Arabic: مكتبة الإسكندرية | Alexandria | Egypt |
| Biblioteca Nacional de Chile | BNCHL | Spanish: Biblioteca Nacional de Chile | Santiago | Chile |
| Biblioteca Nacional de España | BNE | Spanish: Biblioteca Nacional de España | Madrid | Spain |
| Biblioteca Nacional de Portugal | PTBNP | Portuguese: Biblioteca Nacional de Portugal | Lisbon | Portugal |
| Bibliothèque et Archives nationales du Québec | B2Q | French: Bibliothèque et Archives nationales du Québec | Quebec | Canada |
| Bibliothèque nationale de France | BnF | French: Bibliothèque nationale de France | Paris | France |
| National Library of Greece | ΕΒΕ | Greek: Εθνική Βιβλιοθήκη της Ελλάδος | Athens | Greece |
| Bibliothèque Nationale du Royaume du Maroc (BNRM) | MRBNR | Arabic: المكتبة الوطنية للمملكة المغربية; French: Bibliothèque nationale du Royaume du Maroc | Rabat | Morocco |
| Biografisch Portaal | BPN | Dutch: Biografisch Portaal | The Hague | Netherlands |
| British Library | | – | London | England |
| Danish Agency for Culture and Palaces | | Danish: Kulturstyrelsen | Copenhagen | Denmark |
| Danish Bibliographic Centre | DBC | Danish: Dansk BiblioteksCenter | Ballerup | Denmark |
| German National Library (DNB) | GND | German: Deutsche Nationalbibliothek | Frankfurt | Germany |
| International Standard Name Identifier | ISNI | – | London | United Kingdom |
| Israel Museum | | Hebrew: מוזיאון ישראל | Jerusalem | Israel |
| Istituto Centrale per il Catalogo Unico | ICCU; SBN | Italian: Istituto Centrale per il Catalogo Unico | Rome | Italy |
| Lebanese National Library | LNL | Arabic: المكتبة الوطنية | Beirut | Lebanon |
| Library and Archives Canada | LAC | French: Bibliothèque et Archives Canada | Ottawa, Ontario | Canada |
| Library of Congress; NACO consortium (Name Authority Cooperative Program) | LCCN | – | Washington, D.C. | United States |
| National and University Library in Zagreb | NSK | Croatian: Nacionalna i sveučilišna knjižnica u Zagrebu | Zagreb | Croatia |
| National and University Library of Slovenia | | Slovene: Narodna in univerzitetna knjižnica | Ljubljana | Slovenia |
| National Central Library | NCL; CYT | Chinese: 國家圖書館 | Taipei | Taiwan |
| National Diet Library | NDL | Japanese: 国立国会図書館 | Tokyo; Kyoto | Japan |
| National Institute of Informatics | NII; CiNii | Japanese: 国立情報学研究所 | Tokyo | Japan |
| National Library Board | NLB | – | – | Singapore |
| National Library of Australia | NLA | – | Canberra | Australia |
| National Library of Brazil | BLBNB | Portuguese: Biblioteca Nacional do Brasil | Rio de Janeiro | Brazil |
| National Library of Catalonia | BNC | Catalan: Biblioteca de Catalunya | Barcelona | Spain |
| National Library of Estonia | ERRR | Estonian: Eesti Rahvusraamatukogu | Tallinn | Estonia |
| National and University Library of Iceland (NULI) | UIY | Icelandic: Háskólabókasafn | Reykjavík | Iceland |
| National Library of Ireland | N6I | Irish: Leabharlann Náisiúnta na hÉireann | Dublin | Ireland |
| National Library of Israel | NLI (deprecated); J9U | Hebrew: הספרייה הלאומית | Jerusalem | Israel |
| National Library of Korea | KRNLK | Korean: 국립중앙도서관 | Seoul | Korea |
| National Library of Latvia | LNB | Latvian: Latvijas Nacionālā bibliotēka | Riga | Latvia |
| National Library of Luxembourg | BNL | Luxembourgish: Nationalbibliothéik Lëtzebuerg; French: Bibliothèque nationale de Luxembourg | Luxembourg City | Luxembourg |
| National Library of Mexico | BNM | Spanish: Biblioteca Nacional de México | Mexico City | Mexico |
| National Library of the Netherlands | NTA | Dutch: Koninklijke Bibliotheek | The Hague | Netherlands |
| National Library of New Zealand | | – | Wellington | New Zealand |
| National Library of Norway | BIBSYS; W2Z | Norwegian: Nasjonalbiblioteket | Trondheim | Norway |
| National Library of Poland | NLP | Polish: Biblioteka Narodowa | Warsaw | Poland |
| National Library of Russia | NLR | Russian: Российская национальная библиотека | Saint Petersburg | Russia |
| National Library of Scotland | | Scottish Gaelic: Leabharlann Nàiseanta na h-Alba; Scots: Naitional Leebrar o Scotland | Edinburgh | Scotland |
| National Library of South Africa | | Afrikaans: Staats-Bibliotheek der Zuid-Afrikaansche Republiek | Cape Town; Pretoria | South Africa |
| National Library of Sweden | SELIBR | Swedish: Kungliga biblioteket - Sveriges nationalbibliotek | Stockholm | Sweden |
| National Library of Wales | | Welsh: Llyfrgell Genedlaethol Cymru | Aberystwyth | Wales |
| National Library of the Czech Republic | NKC | Czech: Národní knihovna České republiky | Prague | Czech Republic |
| National Széchényi Library | NSZL | Hungarian: Országos Széchényi Könyvtár | Budapest | Hungary |
| Perseus Project | PERSEUS | – | Medford, Massachusetts | United States |
| RERO (Library Network of Western Switzerland) | RERO | German: Westschweizer Bibliothekverbund; French: Réseau des bibliothèques de Suisse occidentale Italian: Rete delle bibliotheche della Svizzera occidentale | Martigny | Switzerland |
| Répertoire International des Sources Musicales | RISM | – | Frankfurt | Germany |
| Système universitaire de documentation | SUDOC | French: Système universitaire de documentation | – | France |
| Syriac Reference Portal | SRP | – | Nashville, Tennessee | United States |
| Swiss National Library | SWNL | German: Schweizerische Nationalbibliothek; French: Bibliothèque nationale suisse Italian: Biblioteca nazionale svizzera Romansh: Biblioteca naziunala svizra | Bern | Switzerland |
| Narodowy Uniwersalny Katalog Centralny, NUKAT | NUKAT | Polish: Narodowy Uniwersalny Katalog Centralny | – | Poland |
| Union List of Artist Names – Getty Research Institute | ULAN; JPG | – | Los Angeles, California | United States |
| United States National Agricultural Library | NALT | – | Beltsville, Maryland | United States |
| United States National Library of Medicine | | – | Bethesda, Maryland | United States |
| Vatican Library | BAV | Latin: Bibliotheca Apostolica Vaticana | – | Vatican City |
| Cultuurconnect (Bibnet and LOCUS) | | Digitale Bibliotheek Vlaanderen | Brussels | Belgium |
| Wikidata | WKP | – | Berlin, Germany | International |

=== Libraries added for testing purposes ===
| English Wikipedia entry name | Identifier | Native-language name | Location | Country |
|---|---|---|---|---|
| Lithuanian National Library | LIH | Lithuanian: Lietuvos nacionalinė Martyno Mažvydo biblioteka | Vilnius | Lithuania |
| National and University Library of Slovenia / COBISS | SIMACOB | Slovene: Narodna in univerzitetna knjižnica, NUK | Ljubljana | Slovenia |

== See also ==
- Authority control
- Faceted Application of Subject Terminology (FAST)
- Integrated Authority File (GND)
- International Standard Authority Data Number (ISADN)
- International Standard Name Identifier (ISNI)
- Wikipedia's authority control template for articles

== Sources ==
- Borgman, Christine L. (2015). Big Data, Little Data, No Data: Scholarship in the Networked World. MIT Press. ISBN 978-0-262-32786-2. OCLC 900409008.
