= ResearcherID =

Online author identification software created by Thomson Reuters

- ResearcherID logo
- Available in: English
- Owner: Clarivate Analytics
- Website: publons.com/about/home/
- Registration: Optional
- Launched: January 2008
- Current status: Active
- Written in: English
- OCLC number: 926725318

ResearcherID is an identifying system for scientific authors. The system was introduced in January 2008 by Thomson Reuters Corporation.

This unique identifier aims at solving the problem of author identification and correct attribution of works. In scientific and academic literature, it is common to cite the name, surname, and initials of the authors of an article. However, there are sometimes authors with the same name, initials; or the journal may misspell names, resulting in several spellings for the same authors, and different authors with the same spelling.

Researchers can use ResearcherID to claim their published works and link their unique and persistent ResearcherID number to these works for correct attribution. In this way, they can also keep their publication list up to date and online.

The combined use of the Digital Object Identifier with the ResearcherID allows a unique association of authors and research articles. It can be used to link researchers with registered trials or identify colleagues and collaborators in the same field of research.

In April 2019, ResearcherID was integrated with Publons, a Clarivate Analytics owned platform, where researchers can track their publications, peer reviewing activity, and journal editing work. With ResearcherID now hosted on Publons researchers can keep a more comprehensive view of their research output and contributions in one place. This is particularly important for researchers in fields that predominantly use peer-reviewed conference articles (computer science) or in fields that focus on publishing books and chapters in books (humanities and disciplines in the social sciences).

ResearcherID and Publons are also integrated with Web of Science and ORCID, enabling data to be exchanged between these databases.

ResearcherID has been criticized for being commercial and proprietary, but also praised as "an initiative addressing the common problem of author misidentification".

== Overview ==
As the ongoing globalization of the science and technologies continues, enlarging groups of scientific researchers have stepped into various different fields to study. The dilemmas they are continuously facing include not being able to directly link the author with respective literature, not being up to date with specific topics within the field, etc." biomedical researchers do not possess the capacity to automatically distinguish between two researchers who happen to share the same, or similar, names".

Therefore, unique identifiers for authors were introduced, which have been developing since the end of last century.

ResearcherID, as one of the author identification systems, aiming to offer digital identity to each author and to build closer connections between researchers around the world. First started in 2008 by Thomson Reuters and Elsevier, who were both bibliographic database providers, ResearcherID helped researchers to create comprehensive profiles, containing research fields, key words, published literature, and connections to other researchers in the same research field.

From April 2022, Publons started to move the profiles into the Web of Science so as to avoid data inconsistencies between the two platforms.

== Development ==
In 2008, Thomson Reuters started up the ResearcherID system as an addition of Clarivate Analytics' Web of Science (WoS) database. Researchers were benefited from the system on inter-connection between authors and literatures. Each researcher could list personal publishes in the profiles for others' references. Scholars were also able to find references through searching the researcherID, name of the author or the literature itself. Links under names were created for more direct searches. Meanwhile, creating personal profiles helped others distinguish researchers with the same first and last names, therefore increasing clarification of worldwide scientific progress.

Later, ResearcherID was recommended to relate to Digital Object Identifier (DOI), as to enhance relationships between various researchers, creating larger maps connecting authors in the same research field. Though researchers might work in different fields, it became easier to associate authors with key terms and topics.

The Web of Knowledge platform was connected to ResearcherID in 2011, compensating manual mistakes between profiles and literature. Due to a vast development of unique identifiers in the research field, there has been numbers of systems serving identification process, for example, ORCID, Scopus, ResearcherID and ResearchGate. Missing literature or informational mistakes were frequently shown when one researcher uploaded several profiles on different platforms. Thus, this combination enhanced the reliability of profiles on each platform, and provided a more thorough knowledge to a particular researcher.

In the year 2012, Open Researcher and Contributor ID (ORCID) was integrated with ResearcherID to share and verify information in both systems, improving the efficiency of independent retrieval.

In 2019, ResearcherID was bound with Publons which was a platform for field workers to make appraisals and authentication on researchers, thus enhancing the general contribution of certain literature among the field and global process on certain subjects. Nowadays, ResearcherID is still actively used by amounts of authors and researchers.

== Identifiers ==
ResearcherID, as a self-registered identifier, will be provided whenever a researcher finishes registration in the ResearcherID database. The identifier was the combination of alphabets and numbers, with the last four numbers representing the year registered, for example: Z-0000-2022. By searching either the name of the author or ResearcherID on the Web of Science ResearcherID website, users can find the author's present occupation, his or her publications, key words of research fields, main topics of published literature and direct links to information page of the most cited publications, though full text cannot be uploaded. The ORCID link is also listed on the same page as a connection between two systems.

The ResearcherID's registration will be completed at www.researcherid.com, which is set up on the Web of Knowledge database. Researchers will be asked whether to create the ORCID number or not when completing the registration, in order to transfer data from ResearcherID to ORCID database. ResearcherID accounts can be used to login the Web of Science and Endnote. This enables researchers to arrange their own literature in different profiling systems and track their publications at any time.

Due to the integration of ORCID number and ResearcherID, the Web of Science Core Collection assign them to the Author Identifiers index, enabling researchers to get access to numbers of profiles and publications.

Web of Science Core Collection: Web of Science mainly serves as a citation/abstract database, for full texts cannot be uploaded onto the platform. Users are able to search and analyze any publications as well as their citations and references. Choosing Web of Science Core Collection enables researchers to search literature among the abstract databases.

== Uses ==
Having a unique ResearcherID can:

- Standardizing data across platforms: The Web of Science synchronizes personal information and citation details, which may improve search accuracy.
- Storing authors' personal details and research outputs.
- Facilitating self-positioning within institutions: ResearcherID fosters collaborations and helps align research goals.
- Strengthening connections between authors and investors: Collaboration may enhance motivation and lead to positive research outcomes.
- Students can explore connections within their discipline using cited papers and track citations.
- Providing access to research for beginners and students.

== Integration and Distinction ==
=== ResearcherID and ORCID ===
The combination of ResearcherID and ORCID helps information transfer between two platforms, for example: main research areas, published literature, etc. Through this exchange of information, it can reduce chances of researchers' manual mistakes on profiling. Yet, Researchers cannot directly edit their profiles in the ResearcherID database. If the edition have occurred in other profiles, ORCID platform will automatically change the old information in its database. In addition, ORCID is known for its non-profittable feature. Thus, comparing to ORCID, ResearcherID is sometimes judged as profitable and proprietary, being not open completely to every researcher. Moreover, ResearcherID will accept any literature published under the Web of Science Group products, which means, to some extent, it needs more process before a non WoS-registered researcher to publish the study on this platform. In comparison, ORCID has a larger group of users for it accepts various sources of publication without filtering in advance.

Due to the fact that ResearcherID is proprietary and ORCID is non-proprietary, ORCID has developed to be more community driven than ResearcherID. More authors tend not to use ResearcherID to avoid the connection between researchers and commercial profit. Particularly, journals, books, patents etc., have compulsory regulations for authors' registration in ORCID instead of ResearcherID. In conclusion, ResearcherID plays a more supplementary role among author identifiers, but is more necessary in the Web of Science Groups of products.

Nevertheless, both ResearcherID and ORCID have various user populations, and it has benefits to have both. For ResearcherID, authors primarily distribute among Physical Science, Social Science, Arts and Humanities. ORCID has the largest group in Health Science, but due to its non-profitable features, ORCID accepts more content types, and thus it also has sufficient population in other science disciplines. Nevertheless, neither researcherID nor ORCID focuses on the mathematics field. Instead, arXiv ID mainly serves in the discipline of Mathematics.

=== ResearcherID and Scopus ===
Scopus' users spread across most disciplines included in health science and other non-mathematics areas. There are also a relative number of authors in the field of science, technology, arts and humanities. Though the Web of Science does not have as many citations as Scopus does, the searching results therefore become more accurate compared with Scopus. Yet, data inconsistencies still exist in the Web of Science. For example, the spelling of the authors' surname and given name, authors' names not corresponding to the correct paper, etc.

=== ResearcherID and Google Scholar ===
Google Scholar, like ResearcherID, is also a widely accepted profiling site. However, ResearcherID provides a list of bibliographic information based on authors and publications, while Google Scholar contains full papers, links to multiple accesses, authors, etc. On the other hand, the Web of Science is able to associate Google Scholar with other solutions, for example, Endnote. In other words, Google Scholar covers a larger range of research studies, yet have included bibliographic problems, for example, author sequence, different paper title, etc. ResearcherID has a relatively smaller coverage but is more accurate than Google Scholar.

== Inadequacy ==
ResearcherID was proved to have less users compared with other author identifiers. As a result of an investigation in 2020, there were 172689 profiles in ResearcherID platform, which was less than the 657319 on Scopus database, and 513236 on ResearchGate. ResearcherID was highly recommended for usage, but was not selected frequently because it was not automatically coded. On the other hand, ORCID code was more widely accepted by international journals and publishers than ResearcherID and was somehow mandatory for publications. The Scopus author ID was another researcher identifier which allocate a code directly to any author in the system. Therefore, it is encouraged that ResearcherID to realize automatic registration.

Though researchers tend to choose ResearchID for identification less, this system can be used to prove the author sets, especially after having combined with other identifiers. On one hand, ResearcherID can transfer files into RIS form which is specifically established for research information system. The form includes all necessary messages for a certain literature, including its publisher, publishing date, book name, etc. In other words, the transformation will consolidate the information on ResearcherID into a more systematic form, helping both scholars and non-scholars reach the information they are looking for. On the other hand, through using ResearcherID on the Publons platform, users can find the exact researcher, as well as his or her academic collaborators. As an interactive lab environment, researcherID makes it easier to reference literature for the research field and global use.

There are also problems with registration. Since authors complete their registration through self-identification, it becomes easier to have wrong or missing data. For example, the information of authors' geographic addresses is found to be missing in numbers of profiles among the disciplines of social science, arts and humanities. The missing information may slow the research process, for the users cannot compare specific authors with other researchers in the same region, states, countries, or continent. This reduces the connection between individual authors and other institutions as well. Meanwhile, it may be misleading for external users while using the Web of Science. The Information can be assigned into different categories, and result in polarized judgements towards the authors and their literature.

While the issue of self-identification registration has been addressed, it is not all of the citations uploaded on the Web of Science that are counted towards the citation metrics, which affects the accuracy and reliability of this bibliographic networking platform. These citation metrics are suggested to represent the overall performance of the literature and its influence in relevant disciplines. The eventual data and analyses may vary when the authors' information is missing or not all papers are included. In addition, there have been a number of empty profiles on the Web of Science with unclear reasons, and yet still are counted in statistics. It is suggested that certain options should be conducted towards these profiles, so as to improve the quality of the networking sites.

== See also ==
- International Standard Name Identifier
- OpenID
- Virtual International Authority File
- Unique Identifier
- author profiling
