= Pay transparency =

Type of economic principle

Pay transparency (also known as wage transparency, salary transparency, and compensation transparency) involves disclosure of employee compensation amounts, either among other employees in an organization, to owners, to government regulators, or to the public.

Some jurisdictions have pay transparency laws intended to prevent discrimination based on demographics like gender or race. These laws require job listings to give a salary range for the position. To eliminate unintentional discrimination and treat employees more ethically, some organizations have adopted radical transparency, disclosing all employees' compensation internally and either equalizing pay for similar positions or justifying differences.

Some jurisdictions mandate disclosure of executive compensation to shareholders, in an attempt to reduce excessive compensation.

According to a 2024 review of existing evidence, pay transparency within a firm tends to narrow coworker wage gaps, but also incentivizes employers to bargain more aggressively to keep average wages down. Within-firm pay transparency also reveals to workers pay differences across different levels of seniority, which "can lead to more accurate and more optimistic beliefs about earnings potential, increasing employee motivation and productivity." Cross-firm pay transparency overall strengthens the power of workers against employers, as workers are more likely to seek higher-paying jobs, and negotiate higher pay at their current job.

A 2024 experiment conducted on employees at an Asian bank showed that revealing salaries of their managers, especially to those who predicted it lower than actual, led the employees to become more productive.

== Compensation transparency by country ==
=== Canada ===
Under Ontario's Employment Standards Act, it is illegal for an employer to "intimidate, dismiss or otherwise penalize an employee or threaten to do so" because the worker has disclosed their own wages or because the worker has inquired about the wages of another worker for the purposes of determining the employer's compliance with the law's Equal Pay for Equal Work provisions.

British Columbia's Pay Transparency Act requires disclosing expected pay or pay ranges on job postings. The legislation also prohibits penalizing an employee who asks about their pay, reveals their pay to another employee or asks the employer about its pay transparency report.

=== United Kingdom ===
In the United Kingdom, the Equality Act 2010 protects the rights of workers to discuss pay and forbids employers from prohibiting a worker's "relevant pay disclosure".

=== United States ===
==== Federal law ====
In the United States, the National Labor Relations Act protects the right of employees to discuss compensation without retaliation from their employer.

==== By state or territory ====
California, Connecticut, Hawaii, Illinois, Maryland, New York, Nevada, Rhode Island, and Washington have passed compensation transparency laws as of 2023. Some US cities also have compensation transparency laws, including New York City.

New York enacted a pay transparency law in 2023. The law requires employers to publicly disclose job salary ranges. Massachusetts enacted a pay transparency law in July, 2024, which applies to businesses with more than 24 employees, with data reporting for businesses with 100 or more employees.

Maryland's Equal Pay for Equal Work law states that "an employer may not prohibit an employee from inquiring about, discussing, or disclosing the wages of an employee or another employee".

== See also ==
- Equal pay for equal work § Transparency laws
