= DDEX =

Music industry standards organization

Digital Data Exchange (DDEX) is an international standards-setting organisation that was formed in 2006 to develop standards that enable companies to communicate information along the digital supply chain more efficiently by:

- Developing standard message and file formats (XML or flat-file)
- Developing choreographies for specific business transactions
- Developing communication protocols (SFTP or based on web services)
- Working with industry bodies to create a more efficient supply chain.

DDEX's focus is the music industry, particularly recorded music. It has three membership levels—charter, full, and associate—with a total of about 100 members. The charter members of DDEX were

- Amazon
- American Society of Composers, Authors and Publishers
- Apple Inc.
- Broadcast Music, Inc.
- Downtown Music
- GEMA
- Google
- Kobalt Music Group
- Pandora Media, Inc.
- Phonographic Performance Limited
- PRS for Music
- Sacem
- Société Civile des Producteurs Phonographiques
- Society of Composers, Authors and Music Publishers of Canada
- Sony Music Entertainment
- SoundExchange
- Spotify
- Tencent Music
- Universal Music Group
- Warner Music Group

== Business transactions addressed ==
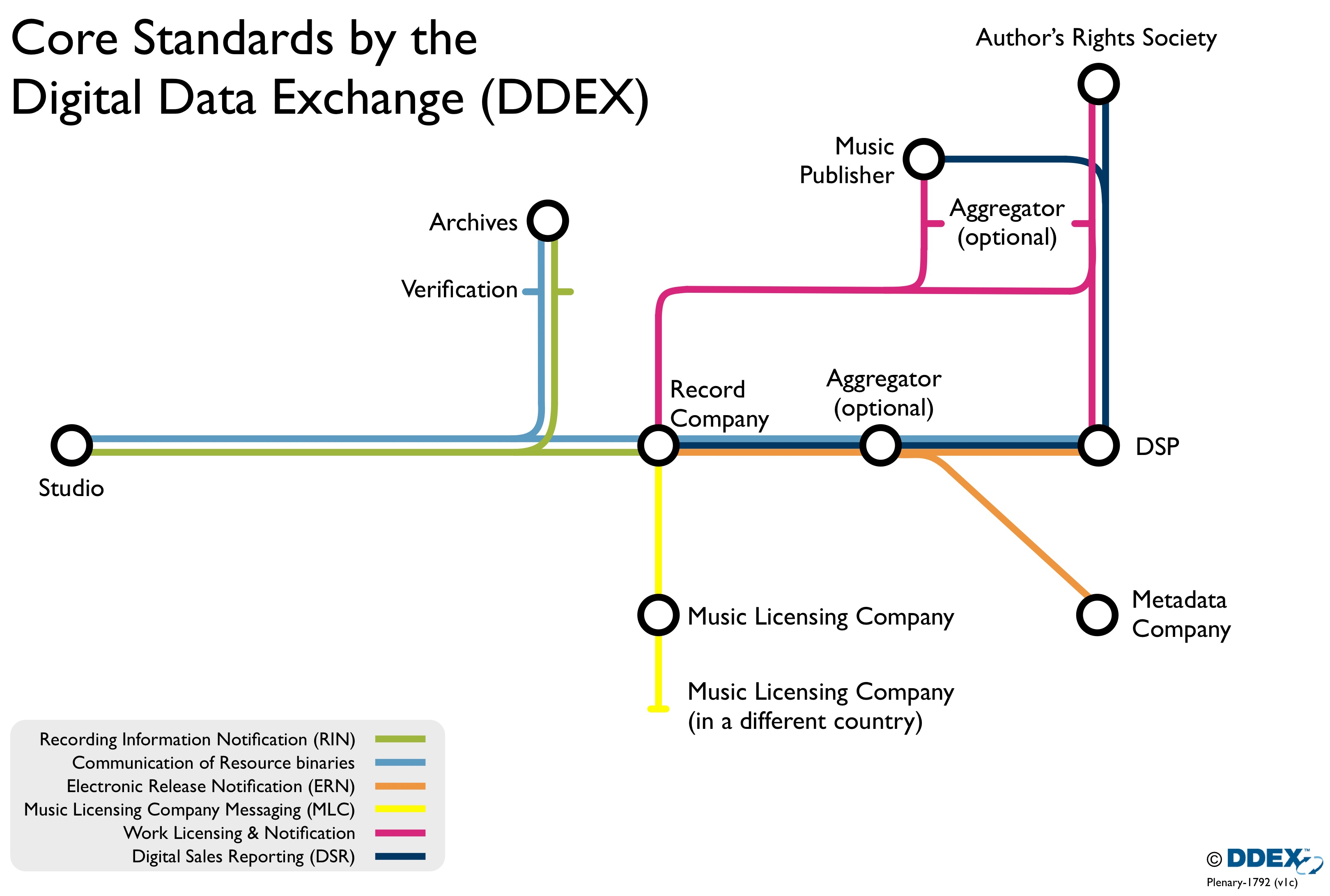
Business Transactions supported by DDEX

DDEX's standards address a series of business transactions, including:

- Release deliveries
- Sales/usage reporting
- Communication with and amongst Music Licensing Companies
- Licensing of musical works
- Collection of information on sound recordings and musical works in the recording studio

== Using DDEX standards ==
All DDEX standards are available from the DDEX Knowledge Base, with complete documentation. DDEX has also created a series of free introductory videos.

Implementers that want to use any of the DDEX standards are required to take out a software licence. This licence is a royalty-free click wrap licence that grants implementers access to the intellectual property embedded in the DDEX standards.
