= Danish Bibliographic Centre =

Danish company maintaining bibliographic information

Coordinates: 55°43′22.07″N 12°22′58.06″E

The Danish Bibliographic Centre (DBC A/S), based in Ballerup, Denmark, produces and supplies bibliographic data and information services — for example, the Danish DK5 system (DK5 Decimalklassedeling) derived from the Dewey Decimal Classification — to Danish libraries.

DBC provides its data via DanBib, a joint bibliography for the entire Danish library system that includes a common reference database of national bibliography and holdings in all Danish public and research libraries. The system includes features to facilitate interlibrary loans, reuse of bibliographic data verification as well as links to relevant databases such as the Library of Congress and the ISSN system.

The Danish ISBN office, which allocates the Danish ISBN prefixes 87- in the ISBN-10 case and 978-87- in the ISBN-13 case, is part of the Danish Bibliographic Centre.
