= ORCID =

Alphanumeric technical code

- Full name: Open Researcher and Contributor ID
- Organization: ORCID, Inc.
- Introduced: 16 October 2012 (14 years ago)
- No. issued: 14,727,479
- No. of digits: 16
- Check digit: 0009-0004-9914-908X
- Example: 0000-0001-5882-6823
- Website: orcid.org

The ORCID (/ˈɔːrkɪd/; Open Researcher and Contributor ID) is a nonproprietary persistent identifier, in the form of an alphanumeric code, to uniquely identify authors and contributors of scholarly communication.

This addresses the problem that a particular author's contributions to the scientific literature or humanities publications can be hard to recognize, as most personal names are not unique, they can change (such as with marriage), have cultural differences in name order, contain inconsistent use of first-name abbreviations and employ different writing systems. It provides a persistent identity for humans, similar to tax ID numbers, that are created for content-related entities on digital networks by digital object identifiers (DOIs).

The ORCID system includes a website and services to look up authors and their bibliographic output (and other user-supplied pieces of information).

== Uses ==
ORCID aims to provide a persistent code for people, to address the problem that a particular author's contributions to scholarly communication can be hard to recognize, as most personal names are not unique, and thus multiple persons of the same name could contribute to the same scholarly field, even from the same institutional department. Further, names can change (such as with marriage); there are cultural differences in name ordering conventions; journals make inconsistent use of first-name abbreviations, name suffixes, and middle initials; and employ different writing systems and transliterations.

The ORCID organization, ORCID Inc., offers registered users an online means of maintaining "a constantly updated 'digital curriculum vitae' providing a picture of their contributions to science going far beyond the simple publication list", hosted by ORCID, edited by the user.

== Development and launch ==
ORCID was first announced in 2009 as a collaborative effort by publishers of scholarly research "to resolve the author name ambiguity problem in scholarly communication". The "Open Researcher Contributor Identification Initiative"—hence the name ORCID – was created temporarily prior to incorporation.

A prototype was developed on software adapted from that used by Thomson Reuters for its ResearcherID system. ORCID, Inc. was incorporated as an independent nonprofit organization in August 2010 in Delaware, United States of America, with an international board of directors. Its executive director, Chris Shillum, was appointed in September 2020; he succeeded the founding ED, Laurel Haak, who was appointed in April 2012. From 2026, the board is chaired by Heath Marks of the Australian Access Federation (the previous chair was Veronique Kiermer of PLOS). ORCID is freely usable and interoperable with other ID systems. On 16 October 2012, ORCID launched its registry services and started issuing user identifiers.

== Adoption ==
- On 15 November 2014, ORCID announced the one-millionth registration.
- On 20 November 2020, ORCID announced the ten-millionth registration.
- As of 2 August 2022, the number of live accounts reported by ORCID was 14,727,479.

To encourage others to join them in supporting the adoption of ORCID, an open letter dated 1 January 2016 was crafted with "publishers that signed this open letter committed to requiring ORCID iDs following specific implementation standards".

In a 2021 update to the Springer Nature website, they noted that they would thenceforth "support verifying and crediting your [peer] review activity directly from our manuscript submission systems to ORCID".

== Identifiers ==
Formally, ORCID IDs are specified as URLs, for example, the ORCID ID for Josiah S. Carberry (a fictitious professor used in examples and testing) is https://orcid.org/0000-0002-1825-0097 (both https:// and http:// forms are supported; the former became canonical in November 2017). However, some publishers use the short form, e.g. "ORCID: 0000-0002-1825-0097" (as a URN).

ORCID IDs are a subset of the International Standard Name Identifier (ISNI), under the auspices of the International Organization for Standardization (as ISO 27729), and the two organizations are cooperating. ISNI will uniquely identify contributors to books, television programmes, and newspapers, and has reserved a block of identifiers for use by ORCID, in the range 0000-0001-5000-0007 to 0000-0003-5000-0001. It is therefore possible for a person to legitimately have both an ISNI and an ORCID ID – effectively, two ISNIs.

Both ORCID and ISNI use 16-character identifiers, using the digits 0–9, and separated into groups of four by hyphens. The final character, which may also be a letter "X" representing the value "10" (for example, Stephen Hawking's ORCID is https://orcid.org/0000-0002-9079-593X), is a MOD 11-2 check digit conforming to the ISO/IEC 7064:2003 standard.

== Members, sponsors and registrants ==
By the end of 2013, ORCID had 111 member organizations and over 460,000 registrants. On 15 November 2014, ORCID announced the one-millionth registration, and on 20 November 2020 the ten-millionth registration. As of 2 August 2022, ORCID reported 1258 member organizations and 14,727,479 live accounts. The organizational members include many research institutions such as Caltech and Cornell University, and publishers such as Elsevier, Springer, Wiley and Nature Publishing Group. There are also commercial companies including Thomson Reuters, academic societies and funding bodies.

Grant-making bodies such as the Wellcome Trust (a charitable foundation) also mandate that applicants for funding provide an ORCID identifier.

=== National implementations ===
In several countries, consortia, including government bodies as partners, are operating at a national level to implement ORCID. For example, in Italy, seventy universities and four research centres are collaborating under the auspices of the Conference of Italian University Rectors (CRUI) and the National Agency for the Evaluation of the University and Research Institutes (ANVUR), in a project implemented by Cineca, a not-for-profit consortium representing the universities, research institutions, and the Ministry of Education. In Australia, the government's National Health and Medical Research Council (NHMRC) and Australian Research Council (ARC) "encourage all researchers applying for funding to have an ORCID identifier". The French scientific article repository HAL also invites its users to enter their ORCID ID.

== Integrations ==
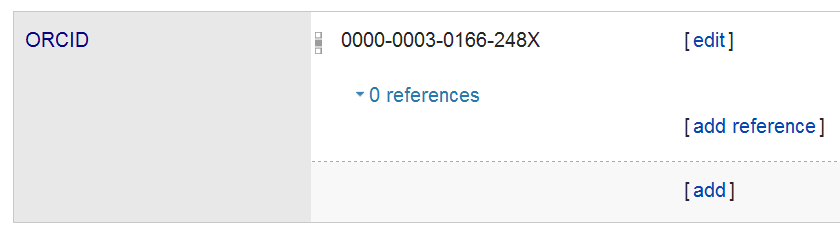
Nick Jennings's ORCID in his Wikidata entry

Both Wikipedia and Wikidata include pages with ORCID identifiers.

As of 2014 in addition to members and sponsors, journals, publishers, and other services have or had included ORCID in their workflows or databases. In 2014 to 2016 some online services created tools for exporting data to, or importing data from, ORCID.

In October 2015, DataCite, Crossref and ORCID announced that the former organisations would update ORCID records, "when an ORCID identifier is found in newly registered DOI names".

Some ORCID data may also be retrieved as RDF/XML, RDF Turtle, XML or JSON. ORCID uses GitHub as its code repository.

== See also ==
- Authority control
- Digital Author Identifier (DAI)
- Digital object identifiers (DOI)
- List of academic databases and search engines
- Research Organization Registry (ROR) – similar concept for research organizations
- Ringgold identifier (RIN)
- Virtual International Authority File (VIAF)
