= Comparison of research networking tools and research profiling systems =

Research networking (RN) is about using tools to identify, locate and use research and scholarly information about people and resources. Research networking tools (RN tools) serve as knowledge management systems for the research enterprise. RN tools connect institution-level/enterprise systems, national research networks, publicly available research data (e.g., grants and publications), and restricted/proprietary data by harvesting information from disparate sources into compiled profiles for faculty, investigators, scholars, clinicians, community partners and facilities. RN tools facilitate collaboration and team science to address research challenges through the rapid discovery and recommendation of researchers, expertise and resources.

== Use ==
RN tools differ from search engines like Google in that RN tools access information in databases and other data not limited to web pages. They also differ from social networking systems in that they represent a compendium of data ingested from authoritative and verifiable sources rather than predominantly individually-posted information, making RN tools more reliable. Yet, RN tools have sufficient flexibility to allow for profile editing. RN tools provide resources to bolster human connections: they can make non-intuitive matches, do not depend on serendipity and do not have a propensity to return only to previously identified collaborations/collaborators. RN tools generally have associated analytical capabilities that enable evaluation of collaboration and cross-disciplinary research/scholarly activity, especially over time.

RN tools and research profiling systems can help researchers gain recognition. Active promotion of scholarship is an aspect of the publication cycle. Commercial and non-profit services help researchers increase visibility and recognition. Digital researcher services enhance discoverability, shareability and citability of scholarship. According to Shanks and Arlitsch, digital researcher services fall into three categories:

- Author/Researcher Identification—these services provide infrastructure that may be used in the other two categories, such as unique identifiers and name disambiguation.
- Academic and Professional Networking—most succinctly described as "social networking for academics," these services focus on connecting users based on research interest, affiliation, geography or other variables.
- Reference and Citation Management—these tools and services include some of the functionality and features of other categories, although their primary focus is on management of citations that a researcher compiles for use within a publication or for sharing with other researchers.

Importantly, data harvested into RN tools can be repurposed, especially if available as Linked Open Data (RDF triples). These RN tools enhance research support activities by providing data for customized, web pages, CV/biosketch generation and data tables for grant proposals.

== General ==
General
Research Networking Tool	Product Reference	Developer/Owner	Open source	Adopters
AcademicLabs		AcademicLabs	No	Top pharmaceutical companies, biotech companies, academics from hundreds of universities, worldwide.
Activity Insight		Digital Measures	No	Hundreds of major research institutions around the world
C-IKNOW		Science of Networks in Communities (SONIC) - Northwestern University	Yes	National Cancer Institute, National Science Foundation
PROFILES by Mentis (formerly Collaborative Partnership / Profile System)		Inknowledge, Inc (previously University of Texas at Arlington)	No (Profiles is available in a free forever plan)	UT Arlington, UT Pan American, University of North Texas Health Science Center, UT El Paso, UT San Antonio, UT Tyler, UT Health Science Center, University of North Texas (formerly), UT Dallas, UT Health Center at Tyler, Texas Christian University, Gulf Coast Consortia: Rice University, Baylor College of Medicine and several others
Community Academic Profiles - CAP		Stanford University	No	Stanford University
Converis		Clarivate Analytics	No	Several universities, governments and funders across North and South America, Europe, Middle East, North Africa, Sub Saharan Africa and Asia.
Curvita Profile Manager		SciMed Solutions	No	University of North Carolina, University of Virginia, Duke University
CUSP - Columbia University Scientific Profiles		Columbia University	No	Columbia University
Digital Vita		Center for Dental Informatics - University of Pittsburgh	Yes	University of Pittsburgh, Pitt Health Sciences Center
Dimensions		Digital Science	No	University of Michigan, University of Massachusetts - Lowell, University of California San Diego.
Elsevier's Pure		Elsevier	No	250 implementations worldwide containing profiles for over 185,000 researcher profiles.
Elsevier's SciVal		Elsevier	No	Over 200 adopters worldwide
Epernicus Solutions & Epernicus Network		Epernicus	No (but Epernicus Network is free to use)	Harvard, MIT, Indiana University, Stanford, University of California Berkeley (but not exclusively)
Epistemio		Epistemio	No	N/A (platform is directed toward individual researcher use)
ERIM Member Profile System (ERIM MIS)		Erasmus Research Institute of Management, Erasmus University Rotterdam, Netherlands	No	Erasmus University
Esploro		Ex Libris	No	> 10 in early adopter program; Ex-Libris has a large presence in the higher Education community
EUREKA! Enhancing Student Research		University of Texas at Austin (UTA)	No	University of Texas at Austin
Expertise @ Maryland		University of Maryland	Yes (will be)	University of Maryland College Park
Faculty Profile System		University of California Irvine	No	UC Irvine
Faculty Profiles System		Stony Brook University	No	Stony Brook University
Faculty Research Information Profile (FRIP)	(Note: Discontinued. Work on this system ceased; moved on to developing Digital Vita)	University of Pittsburgh	N/A	(formerly) University of Pittsburgh
Faculty Scholarly Productivity Index		Academic Analytics, LLC	No	Unknown
Faculty180		Interfolio	No	Institutions of higher education in the United States and Canada.
GENIUS		InfoEd Global	No	Many Big Ten/CIC institutions
Google	(Note: Google search generated from an institution's home page or Google search limited to only one domain (e.g., university.edu))	Google	No (but anyone can access Google)	Anyone can access
HUBzero		Purdue University	Yes	Indiana CTSI, Indiana University, Purdue University, Notre Dame
iamResearcher		University of Southampton, UK	Unknown	N/A (platform is directed toward individual researcher use)
iAMscientist		iAMscientist.inc	No	Unknown
i2iConnect		Indiana University	No (but original software from ThemesJoomla is)	N/A (platform is directed toward individual researcher use)
InCites		Clarivate Analytics	No	Unknown
INDURE (Indiana Database for University Research Expertise)		Indiana University / Purdue University	No	Ball State, Indiana University, Purdue University, University of Notre Dame
IRIS (Institutional Research Information System)		CINECA	Yes (will be in CERIF mode in first half of 2016)	60 universities
Knode		Knode	No	Multiple, anyone can use, collaborating with VIVO and UCSF
The Lens		Cambia	No (but free to use and API available)	Researcher, Universities, Research institutes, Patent Offices
Lattes Platform		CNPq - Brazil	Unknown	N/A (Platform is directed toward individual researcher use in Brazil)
LatticeGrid		Northwestern University Clinical and Translational Sciences Institute (NUCATS) - Biomedical Informatics Center (NUBIC)	Yes	Northwestern Feinberg School of Medicine & Cancer Center, UCSF Cancer Center, Fox Chase Cancer Center, University of Michigan, Case Western University
LinkedIn		LinkedIn	No (but LinkedIn is free to use)	N/A (Platform is directed toward individual researcher use. Millions of users are registered globally.)
Scipinion		SciPinion	No (SciPinion is free to use and access)	Platform is for individual researcher use. Researches can participate in polls, ask/answer questions, and apply for paid peer review.
Life Science Network		Life Science Network gGmbH	Yes (upon request)	Anyone can use.
Loki		University of Iowa	No	University of Iowa Institute for Clinical and Translational Science
Lyterati		Entigence Corporation	No	George Washington University, The New School, Lehigh University
McCormick Collaboration Visualization Tool		Northwestern University	No	McCormick School of Engineering and Applied Science at Northwestern University
Mendeley		Elsevier	No	Anyone can use
MizzouLinks		University of Missouri	Unknown	University of Missouri
MyScienceWork		Unknown	No (but anyone can register and use the network)	Anyone can register and use. The network is directed at the individual researcher
OSU:pro		Ohio State University	No (but can be licensed)	Ohio State University
Pivot		ProQuest, LLC	No	100 university campuses and research organizations globally
Portfolio & Showroom		University of Applied Arts Vienna	Yes (Apache License)	University of Applied Arts Vienna, Academy of Fine Arts Vienna, Bertha von Suttner Privatuniversität, Catholic Private University of Linz, Mozarteum University Salzburg (testing)
Profiles Research Networking Software		Harvard University	Yes (BSD license)	Harvard, UCSF, and many others
REACH NC Life Science Experts Visualization Tool		RENCI (Renaissance Computing Institute, a collaboration between University of North Carolina at Chapel Hill, Duke University and North Carolina State University) Duke Research Triangle Institute, University of North Carolina General Administration	No (but free to the public)	Appalachian State University Duke University East Carolina University Elizabeth City State University Fayetteville State University NC A&T North Carolina Central University North Carolina State University RTI International UNC-Asheville University of North Carolina at Chapel Hill UNC-Charlotte UNC-Greensboro UNC-Pembroke UNC-Wilmington Western Carolina University Winston-Salem State University
Research Accelerator		ResearchAccelerator.org	Unknown	Yale University
ResearcherID		Clarivate Analytics	No (but ResearcherID network is free to access and use by individual users)	N/A (Platform is directed toward individual researcher use)
ScholarBridge		ScholarBridge LLC	No	14 university members and free access for any individual student or researcher
SciENcv		A pilot program sponsored by the Federal Demonstration Partnership and the National Science and Technology Council (NSTC) supported by the STAR METRICS program	Yes	Sponsored by the Federal Demonstration Partnership and the NSTC's interagency groups: Research Business Model (RBM) and Science of Science Policy (SoSP)
Symplectic Elements		Digital Science	No (However, an open source is available.)	115+ major research institutions around the world, including the University of Cambridge (UK), University of Oxford (UK), University of Melbourne (AUS), Duke University (US), University of Auckland (NZ), Tufts University (US), and University of Michigan (US).
UNIWeb		Proximify	No	University of Ottawa, McGill University, Dalhousie University, University of British Columbia Okanagan Campus, École de technologie supérieure, CIMVHR
VIVO		Lyrasis	Yes	Cornell University, University of Florida, Washington University in St. Louis, Weill Cornell Medical College, Indiana University, Ponce School of Medicine, Scripps Research Institute, Duke University, University of Colorado at Boulder, Northwestern University, University of Nebraska–Lincoln, University of Melbourne, Griffith University, Chinese Academy of Sciences, etc. There are currently over 140 VIVO implementations in the United States and international VIVO projects in over 25 countries.
WorkWeb		Columbia University	No	Columbia University
Yaffle		Memorial University of Newfoundland	Yes	Memorial University of Newfoundland

== Data sources, ingest and export formats ==
This table provides information on the types of data used in each RN tool and how this data is ingested, along with data export formats (e.g., XML, RDF, RIS, PDF)

Data sources, interoperability
Research Networking Tool	Data Source / Infeed Functionality	Auto Ingest?	Linked Open Data?	Data Export Types
Academic Room	Manual entry of data by users. May be some auto-ingest of PubMed citation data	Unknown	Unknown	Unknown
AcademicLabs	Pubmed, ORCID, funded projects from a.o. NIH, NSF, France, Flanders, Clinical Trials from WHO, ClinicalTrials.gov, EU Clinical Trial Register, Patents from USPTO and EPO, national and regional public repositories, websites, direct input by researchers.	Yes	Unknown	XLS, CSV, JSON
Activity Insight	Information typically imported from the following sources: PubMed, Google Scholar, Scopus, Web of Science, RefWorks, Banner, Datatel, PeopleSoft, CampusVue, Jenzabar, Sedona, EndNote, Mendeley, Zotero, BiBTeX, a RESTful web services API, CSV Data Imports, etc. Also supports various methods of manual entry.	Yes	Yes	RTF, XLS, CSV, PDF, HTML, XML
C-IKNOW	Network Surveys, automated upload for any kind of network data including archival, scientometric, webometric and computer log data. Also import data in GraphML, RDF, and DL (used by UCINET)	Yes(for defined data)	Yes	RDF, XML/RDF
PROFILES by Mentis (formerly Collaborative Partnership / Profile System)	Automated or on-demand import from PubMed, Google Scholar, Web of Science, Scopus, Banner, PeopleSoft, Web Services, Flat files and Manual Entry. Can be easily configured with any institutional subscription or database.	Yes	Yes	RTF, XLS, CSV, PDF, HTML, XML, JSON
Community Academic Profiles - CAP	CAP automatically generates a profile for all faculty, physicians, students, postdocs and staff (both academic and administrative) in the School of Medicine. Data flows automatically from a variety of source systems.	Yes	Unknown	Unknown
Converis	Default connection to Clarivate Analytics Web of Science, Scopus, pubmed, europubmed, etc. Ay internal data feed (HR, finance can be configured)	Yes—can be pre-populated and alerts recommend new data	Yes—can be used to power VIVO	Excel (.xlsx), EndNote (.ciw), BibTex (.bib), XML, JSON, PDF, RTF
Curvita Profile Manager	Information collected from university systems	Yes	Unknown	Unknown
CUSP - Columbia University Scientific Profiles	Databases for employees and grants; PubMed for publications	Yes	Unknown	Unknown
Digital Vita	PubMed, some from HR system, direct input from investigators. System authenticates users through an application developed by the IT group that supports the Senior Vice Chancellor of Health Sciences; that system accesses the HR system for data about employees' rank and status (active or not), working with the grants office to get a regular report of data from their proposal database. Manually entered publications/presentations are automatically forwarded to co-authors.	Yes (Some)	Yes	PDF, RTF
Elsevier's Pure (now integrated with SciVal Experts)	Sources include Scopus, Web of Science, PubMed, Embase, Mendeley, arXiv, Worldcat, CrossRef, Journal TOC, CAB Abstracts, SAO/NASA Astrophysics Data System and SciVal Funding opportunities; Data from institutions' internal systems, including HR data, grants, publications, patents, core facilities/resources, etc. Researchers or proxy users can enter additional content into the profiles, including research statements, research interest keywords, publications, grants, patents, books, creative works, education, researcher datasets, press clippings, awards and honors; free text can also be imported. Integration with all major institutional repositories.	Yes	Yes	XML, RDF, SPARQL, CSV, CERIF XML, MS Word, Excel, PDF, ATOM/XML web services, EndNote/Reference Manager, BibTex, various government assessment submission formats
Elsevier's SciVal	Scopus and ScienceDirect usage data	Yes	No	CSV, PDF, PNG, JPEG
Epernicus Solutions & Epernicus Network	Data entered by applicant	No	Unknown	Unknown
ERIM Member Profile System (ERIM MIS)	ERIM MIS database, Erasmus Publication Repository, Oracle portal	Yes	Unknown	Unknown
Esploro	Information is imported from ProQuest's Summon Service and from the following sources: PubMed, ORCID, BiBTeX, a RESTful web services API, CSV Data Imports, etc. Also supports methods of manual entry.	Yes	Yes	RTF, XLS, CSV, PDF, HTML, XML
EUREKA! Enhancing Student Research	Information about faculty research interests	No	Unknown	Unknown
Expertise @ Maryland	Central university faculty database	Yes	Unknown	Unknown
Faculty Profile System	Manually entered data about the faculty (faculty can enter, a proxy can enter, or designated staff work on maintaining profiles)	No (Faculty status verified by comparison with UC Irvine HR's Academic Personnel system)	Unknown	Unknown
Faculty Research Information Profile (FRIP)	Discontinued. Work on this system ceased; moved on to developing Digital Vita	N/A	N/A	N/A
Faculty Scholarly Productivity Index	FSP Database (2007–2008)	Yes	Unknown	Unknown
GENIUS	InfoEd proprietary grant funding databases	Yes (But only of InfoEd database data. Faculty profile information must be entered manually.)	Unknown	Unknown
Google	Institution's directory, news releases, and other institutional websites	Yes	Yes	Many types, depending on the format of the file retrieved.
HUBzero	Comprehensive portal to support virtual research organizations including modular Web 2.0 tools, modeling and simulation tools, computational integration, identity management, workflow, personal profile management, data management, education	Yes	Yes	Unknown
iamResearcher	Unknown	Unknown	Unknown	Unknown
iAMscientist	PubMed	Yes	Unknown	Unknown
i2iConnect	Listings of industry licensing representatives categorized by product and disease categories with matchmaking and collaborator discovery features	Yes	Unknown	Unknown
InCites	Clarivate Analytics Web of Science, ESI, JCR	No	No	XML, .mbb, XLS
INDURE (Indiana Database for University Research Expertise)	Faculty-entered information about research, faculty home pages	Yes? (Partial?)	Unknown	Unknown
Lattes Database	Unknown	Unknown	Unknown	Unknown
LatticeGrid	Medical School Faculty database, PubMed, InfoEd, Northwestern's eIRB database	Yes	Yes	Microsoft Word, Excel, PDF
The Lens	ORCID and other publicly available sources	Yes	Yes	BibTex, JSON, CSV, PNG, SVG
LinkedIn	Information entered manually by user	No	Unknown	Unknown
Life Science Network	PubMed / Information entered manually by user.	No	Yes	CSV (for some modules).
Loki	Local Medline, PubMed, local NSF award database, local NIH RePORTER database, campus directory services	Yes (Partial)	Unknown	Unknown
Lyterati	PubMed, Google Scholar, BibTex, Ellucian, PeopleSoft, Workday, RESTful APIs, Template Driven Imports, CSV, Excel, Manual Entry Using Webpages, Faculty CVs	Yes	Unknown	PDF, MS Word, Excel, CSV, Web Services
McCormick Collaboration Visualization Tool	Clarivate Analytics Web of Science	Yes	Unknown	Unknown
MizzouLinks	Information collected from interviews and imported from a few institutional systems	No	Unknown	Unknown
MyScienceWork	Information input by user	No	Unknown	Unknown
OSU:pro	OSU systems	Yes	Unknown	Unknown
Pivot	Combines editorially created data on funding opportunities and profiles. Profile data sources from publicly available university organization and faculty member/researcher information, user-generated data, PubMed, Agricola, ERIC, and ProQuest citation databases, indexed faculty/researcher webpages.	Yes (for all citation data from sources listed in DataSource. Profiles editorially created, but user-generated profiles also included)	No	Unknown
Portfolio & Showroom	ORCID, library catalogue, GND, VIAF	No	Yes	BibTex, CSV, PDF
Profiles Research Networking Software	HR systems, PubMed, NIH RePORTER, commercial sources of publication data, institution-provided and user managed data	Yes	Yes	XML, RDF, SPARQL
REACH NC Life Science Experts Visualization Tool	SciVal Experts, RAMSES	Yes	Yes	RSI, CSV, Web-service API
Research Accelerator	Information entered by individual members	No	Unknown	Unknown
ResearcherID	Manually entered biographical and bibliographical information. Members can search Web of Science, Web of Knowledge, and other online collections, or manually enter publication data. Accounts can be created by individuals or by administrators using a web service.	Yes (Partial; profiles created by administrators are pre-populated for individuals to review.)	No	None
SciENcv	Information that would normally be found in a curriculum vitae or biosketch	Yes	Unknown	Uses open data exchange standards
Streamlyne FundFit	Information collected from web scraping and proprietary methods to match researchers with funding opportunities across the Streamlyne FundFit AI / ML SaaS platform.	Yes	No	Native export integration to Streamlyne Research platform
Symplectic Elements	Custom import from any internal data source via API, out of the box automatic bibliographic import (subject to subscriptions where appropriate) from arXiv, Cinii, CrossRef, DBLP, Europe PMC, figshare, PubMed, RePeC, Scopus, Web of Science, with more planned. Secure ORCID integration also available. In-feed from HR/Identity systems, internal grant databases. Integration with all major repository technologies.	Yes Through integrated portals like VIVO and Profiles RNS	Yes Source for linked data	CSV, CERIF XML, MS Word, Excel, PDF (APA6), ATOM/XML web services, EndNote/Reference Manager, BibTex, RDF (Linked Data), various government assessment submission formats
UNIWeb	Users can enter their CV or bibliographic data manually, or import from the Canadian Common CV, PubMed, Google Scholar, Scopus, Web of Science, Bibtek, Endnote.	Unknown	Unknown	XML, MS Word, Excel
VIVO	PubMed, NIH RePORTER, PeopleSoft, internal HR & administrative databases, Scopus (with institutional license), Web of Science (with institutional license); emphasis on verified data sources, many many others being ingested at various institutions.	Yes (manual data entry possible, too)	Yes	RDF, GraphXML, CSV file
Yaffle	Memorial University systems	Yes	Unknown	Unknown

== Data interoperability and integration ==
Whether a research networking tool is compatible with institutional enterprise systems (e.g. human resources databases), can be integrated with other external products or add-ons and can be used for regional, national, international or federated connectivity.

Interoperability
Research Networking Tool	Interoperability with Institutional Enterprise Systems	Interoperability with External Systems	Integration with Add-on Components or Products	Regional, National, International or Federated Connectivity?
Academic Room	No	unknown	unknown	The system is voluntary, so national and international by active inclusion
Activity Insight	Yes (Banner, Datatel, PeopleSoft, CampusVue, Jenzabar, etc.)	Yes (Google Scholar, Scopus, Web of Science, RefWorks, etc.)	Yes (EndNote, Mendeley, Zotero, tools which generate BiBTeX, CSV or XML files)	No
C-IKNOW	No	Yes(is possible)	Unknown	No
PROFILES by Mentis (formerly Collaborative Partnership / Profile System)	Yes	Yes (has API, works with Elsevier PURE, Activity Insight, VIVO etc.)	Yes (funding opportunities from grants.gov)	Yes (National and International)
Community Academic Profiles - CAP	Yes	Yes	Yes	No
Converis	Yes - Bi-directional and one way integrations with institution's enterprise systems available either through APIs or Kettle.	Yes - Standard integrations with Web of Science, EndNote, Kopernio, InCites, EuroPMC, Research Professional, iThenticate, VIVO, Scopus and others. Individual integrations needed for specific institutions can also be configured via APIs or Kettle.	Yes - Integrates with Pentaho Data Integration, InCites and VIVO	Yes
Curvita Profile Manager	Yes	Yes	Unknown	No
CUSP - Columbia University Scientific Profiles	No	Yes PubMed only	Unknown	No
Digital Vita	No	Yes (only PubMed)	Unknown	Yes National federated connectivity through DIRECT2Experts
Elsevier's Pure	Yes institutions have access to Web Services in order to feed data into internal databases; Web Services can be consumed as directed by institution. Pure currently ingests a range of data from institutions' own systems, including grants data, HR data, institutional repositories, publication databases, book listings and more.	Yes Scopus, PubMed, NIH RePORTER, Embase, Mendeley, arXiv, Worldcat, CrossRef, JournalTOC, CAB Abstracts, SAO/NSA Astrophysics Data System, Web of Science, institution's internal databases, including HR data, grants, publications, patents, etc.	Yes Pure integrates with SciVal to allow easy analysis of your researcher impact with the benchmark capabilities of SciVal.	Yes The Pure Community Module interconnects participating institutions into a single centralized Pure instance. Additional functionality enables users to search across different institutions or run cross-campus reports
Elsevier's SciVal	Yes (Institutions have access to the API with Scopus data in order to feed data into internal databases.)	Yes (Integrates with Pure.)	Yes (Scopus & ScienceDirect)	No
Epernicus Solutions & Epernicus Network	Yes (Possible, for Epernicus Solutions)	No	Unknown	No
ERIM Member Profile System (ERIM MIS)	Yes	Yes ID resolver included, so links to external systems are created, like SSRN, ResearcherID, Google scholar alerts & Search, social mention search from personal page, MEEBO sharing possible, Tynt statistics included	Unknown	No
Esploro	Yes Esploro provides multiple REST APIs for integration with enterprise systems such as HR Systems, CRIS / RIM, Institutional Repositories, profiles, grant management systems and more. Integration with repositories can be done also via OAI-PMH and Esploro automatically captures data, such as outputs, grants, researchers profiles and more from multiple institutional and cross- institutional systems.	Yes Integration with the, ProQuest's Summon Service, ORCID, PubMed, CrossRef, DataCite etc. Files can be imported and exported in formats like DublinCore, DataCite and BibTeX.	Yes	Yes Plans to enable consortium and collaboration capabilities based on Ex Libris Alma Network and Community Zones
EUREKA! Enhancing Student Research	No	No	Unknown	No
Expertise @ Maryland	May be possible	No	Unknown	No
Faculty Profile System	No	No	Unknown	No
Faculty Research Information Profile (FRIP)	Discontinued. Work on this system ceased; moved on to developing Digital Vita	N/A	N/A	N/A
Faculty Scholarly Productivity Index	Unknown	Unknown	Unknown	No
GENIUS	Yes	Yes Only other InfoEd modules (SMARTS: Service that automatically sends notices of funding opportunities via email. You provide keywords that describe your research interests, and SMARTS matches those keywords with present funding programs; SPIN: Enables subscribers to directly search for all sponsored programs, past and present, contained within the InfoEd database)	Unknown	No
Google	No	Yes	Possibly	No
HUBzero	No	Yes PubMed; data is semantic web compliant as of August 2011	Possibly	No
iamResearcher	Unknown	Unknown	Unknown	Unknown
iAMscientist	No	Yes PubMed	Unknown	No
i2iConnect	No	No	Unknown	Yes
InCites	Yes (Institutions have access to Web Services in order to feed data into internal databases.)	Yes (Integrates with Converis.)	Yes (Web of Science, ResearcherID)	No
INDURE (Indiana Database for University Research Expertise)	No	No	Unknown	Yes for 4 Indiana institutions only
Lattes Database	Unknown	Unknown	Unknown	Unknown
LatticeGrid	Yes InfoEd, eIRB, Medical School faculty database	Yes (PubMed)	Yes (Possible)	Yes National federated connectivity through DIRECT2Experts
LinkedIn	No	No	Unknown	No
Life Science Network	No	Yes (Pubmed)	No	No
Loki	Yes Possible	Yes	Unknown	No
Lyterati	Yes (Ellucian, PeopleSoft, Workday InfoEd, Coeus)	Yes (PubMed, VIVO, Google Scholar, BibTex or CSV Sources)	Yes (BibTex and CSV)	Yes, capable
McCormick Collaboration Visualization Tool	No	Yes Only Clarivate Analytics Web of Science	Unknown	No
MizzouLinks	Maybe	No	Unknown	No
MyScienceWork	No	Unknown	Unknown	Yes
OSU:pro	No	Unknown	Unknown	No
Pivot	No	Maybe	Unknown	Unknown
Portfolio & Showroom	Yes	Yes ORCID, university's repository, library catalogue. Files can be imported and exported as BibTeX.	Yes	Yes Showroom works as a cross-instance search.
Profiles Research Networking Software	Yes	Yes Pubmed, commercial sources of publication data, semantic web applications via VIVO ontology.	Yes	Yes Profiles Users Group has regular conference calls and works on collaborative software development projects. Profiles can perform federated queries across other Profiles instances, and with other products using linked open data (VIVO ontology) and the DIRECT2Experts API.
REACH NC Life Science Experts Visualization Tool	Yes	Yes Through SciVal API	No	No
Research Accelerator	No	No	Unknown	No
ResearcherID	No	Yes Through ResearcherID download service, institutions can load data into their internal systems. Also is integrated with other Clarivate Analytics offerings, including Web of Science, EndNote, and Research In View	Unknown	No
SciENcv	Yes (is possible through open data exchange standards)	Yes	Unknown	No
Symplectic Elements	Yes Clients have the ability to integrate with existing web profile management systems, export data for business intelligence solutions and easily submit research outcomes for various government assessment exercises. This includes HR, publications, teaching activities, grants, institutional repositories, and any other system providing or consuming research data.	Yes Elements integrates with a variety of external systems including: Altmetric, figshare, ORCID, SHERPA/RoMEO (licensing information), DOAJ (licensing information)	Yes Elements can be linked to all major open repository technologies and an open source is also available.	Yes Elements public profiling tool, Discovery Module, can be integrated with Direct2Expert.
VIVO	Yes Data can be ingested from a wide variety of local sources (including HR, grants, course databases, institutional repositories, membership rosters, research interests, and many others) to reflect a complete view of the institution's priorities and efforts.	Yes see mini-grants; eagle-i; Drupal; many others - any tool that can consume open linked data. Other ongoing collaborations with Wellspring (maintaining VIVO profiles with a focus upon tech transfer and also as a 3rd party implementation service provider) and with Symplectic.	Yes VIVO collaborates with eagle-I on research resources. Future plans include adding many additional data types which are meaningful in the academic research setting. VIVO data are structured using a comprehensive ontology designed for local extension and major ontology "plugins" such as BIBO and eagle-i.	Yes VIVO Consortium received $12.2M NIH ARRA U24 award in 2009 to fully develop software and create national system of federated research expertise directories/research networking systems; All other semantic web-compliant software platforms can be integrated into the consortium (example: Harvard Profiles). Participant in Direct2Experts and VIVO Search
Yaffle	No	No	Unknown	The Canadian research funding councils as well as knowledge mobilization networks across the country (governments and universities) are working to develop a model to share what Yaffle has built

== Users profiled, user interactivity and networking functionality ==
This table provides information on what user population is profiled for each tool, ability for users to edit their own profile data and type of networking. Active networking means that the user can enter connections to the network by entering colleagues' names. Passive networking means that the software infers network connections from a user's publication co-authors and builds a network from these names.

User facilities and social graph
Research Networking Tool	Profiled User Population	Can Users Update Their Own Profile Data?	Type of Networking (Active or Passive)	Includes Functionality to Match Expertise with Funding Opportunities
Academic Room	Anyone can create a profile. Profiled categories include "Faculty", "Grad Students", "Undergrads", "Professionals"	Yes	Active	No
AcademicLabs	Research Group profiles and profiles for all researchers with ORCID, publications, patents, clinical trials or funded projects.	Yes	Active and Passive	Yes
Activity Insight	Faculty, Staff, Graduate Students	Yes	Active and Passive	Yes
C-IKNOW	Defined using Web of science ID or on an ad hoc basis	No	Active and Passive	No
PROFILES by Mentis (formerly Collaborative Partnership / Profile System)	Faculty, Students, Staff, Equipment Owners, Research Centers, Facilities, Technologies, Units etc. as per institution's needs	Yes	Active and Passive	Yes
Community Academic Profiles - CAP	Active Stanford physicians, School of Medicine faculty, students, staff and postdocs.	Yes	Active and Passive	Unknown
Curvita Profile Manager	All	Unknown	No networking	Unknown
CUSP - Columbia University Scientific Profiles	All Columbia faculty	Yes	Active	Unknown
Digital Vita	All	Yes	Passive	Unknown
Elsevier's Pure	Any researchers can be included	Yes the Administration module enables users to enter content into their profiles via forms, uploads or imports. Content types supported include (but not limited to): Persons, awarded grants, journals, org units, projects, events, equipment, activities, press clippings, funding opportunities, research outputs (from journal articles to memorandums of understanding), impacts, applications, datasets, student theses, courses taught and prizes	Active and Passive	Yes Funding Institution within Pure, interacts with Pure collecting funding opportunities to the profile researcher page with no manual effort.
Elsevier's SciVal	All published researchers	Yes, SciVal links to profiles in Scopus and researchers can submit feedback on profiles within Scopus to have papers added or removed.	Passive	No
Epernicus Solutions & Epernicus Network	Anyone who enters a profile (for Epernicus Network)	Yes (for Epernicus Network)	Passive	Unknown
Epistemio	Any researcher who creates a profile	Yes	N/A	No
ERIM Member Profile System (ERIM MIS)	Multiple faculties at Erasmus use it	Unknown	Active	Unknown
Esploro	Faculty, Staff, Library Staff, Graduate Students	Yes	Active and Passive	Yes (integration with Pivot and Research Professional)
EUREKA! Enhancing Student Research	University of Texas at Austin faculty	Unknown	No networking	Unknown
Expertise @ Maryland	All	Unknown	Currently passive, but building active	Unknown
Faculty Profile System	Any faculty at UC Irvine	Yes	No networking	Unknown
Faculty Research Information Profile (FRIP)	N/A	N/A	N/A	N/A
Faculty Scholarly Productivity Index	Federally funded, published faculty	Unknown	No networking	Unknown
GENIUS	Any faculty member who creates a profile on the system	Yes	Passive	Unknown
Google	Anyone can be searched on Google	N/A	No networking	No
HUBzero	Indiana University, Indiana University School of Medicine, Purdue University, U. of Notre Dame, Regenstrief	Unknown	Active	Unknown
iamResearcher	Any researcher who creates a profile	Yes	Passive (?)	Unknown
iAMscientist	Any researcher who creates a profile	Yes	Passive	Unknown
i2iConnect	Industry licensing representatives	Unknown	Passive	Unknown
InCites	All published	Yes	Passive	No
INDURE	All faculty at 4 Indiana institutions	Unknown	Passive	Unknown
LatticeGrid	Currently Medical School faculty only. Developed for biomedical research organizations	Yes (Users can update the Medical School faculty database, which then feeds LatticeGrid	Passive)	Yes (Connected to a Northwestern tool called FacultyConnect to match faculty with a special limited set of Northwestern-specific non-federal funding opportunities in the life and biomedical sciences domains)
Lattes Database	Curriculum and institutions database of Science and Technology areas in Brazil. Anyone can create a profile.	Yes	No apparent networking	Unknown
The Lens	Profiles are automatically created and can be linked (e.g. via ORCID)	Yes	Active and Passive	Unknown
LinkedIn	Anyone who creates a LinkedIn profile	Yes	Passive and Active	Unknown
Life Science Network	Anyone who creates a profile	Yes	Active and Passive	No
Loki	All faculty at University of Iowa	Yes	Passive	Unknown
Loop	Anyone who creates a profile	Yes	Passive and Active	Unknown
Lyterati	Faculty, academic administrators (department chairs, deans, provost), center directors, grad students, staff	Yes	Active and Passive	Yes (through advanced searching and web profile exploration)
McCormick Collaboration Visualization Tool	All Northwestern publications from Web of Science	No	Passive	No
MizzouLinks	Currently a pilot group from two Missouri interdisciplinary centers	Unknown	Passive	Unknown
MyScienceWork	Anyone who creates a profile	Yes	Active and Passive	Unknown
OSU:pro	All OSU faculty	Unknown	No apparent networking	Unknown
Pivot	3 million profiles (and growing, according to the publisher). Profiles are compiled even without user registration, but can only be viewed by registered users	Yes	Passive	Yes through a direct connection with the COS product
Portfolio & Showroom	All users may be included (as defined by the university).	Yes	Passive and Active	No
Profiles	All users as defined by each institution. "Profiles" are also created for institutions, departments, concepts, publications, networks, events or any other class defined in the ontology	Yes	Passive and Active	No
ReachNC	UNC faculty in various disciplines, Duke, and RTI Fellows	Yes	Passive	No
Research Accelerator	Any member of the Yale research enterprise	Yes (?)	Passive	Unknown
ResearcherID	Anyone who creates a profile	Yes	Passive and Active	Unknown
SciENcv	Not yet established	Not yet established	No apparent networking	No
Symplectic Elements	All users may be included (as defined by institution).	Yes (Profiles are automatically populated with data, as dictated by internal and external data feeds. Some profile data can be manually curated by end users, proxy users, or administrators. Users can create new relationships between elements.)	Passive and Active	Yes - Through integrations with research news and funding information provider *Research, researchers are able to get tailored funding opportunities linked to their Elements accounts.
VIVO	All users (as defined by the institution)	Yes	Passive and Active	Possibly
Yaffle	All Memorial University faculty	Yes	Passive	Unknown

== Controlled vocabulary, ontologies and author disambiguation ==
This table provides information on the types of controlled vocabulary or thesauri used by the tools, as well as ontologies supported and whether author disambiguation is performed by the software.

Ontologies and disambiguation
Research Networking Tool	Thesaurus/Controlled Vocabulary Used	Ontology/Ontologies Supported	Automatic Author Disambiguation
Academic Room	unknown	unknown	No
AcademicLabs	Term suggestions and filters use a.o. MeSH and MAG	unknown	Yes
Activity Insight	Yes	Fully customizable data collection screens; campus, college and department-defined ontologies	Yes
C-IKNOW	Not applicable	Uses elements of FOAF and Dublin Core in RDF; uses Pellet reasoning engine	No (but can be done in conjunction with software developed at Northwestern University)
PROFILES by Mentis (formerly Collaborative Partnership / Profile System)	Yes	Dublin Core, Social Media and compatible with VIVO and other popular ontologies	Yes
Community Academic Profiles - CAP	MeSH	Unknown	Yes (partial)
Converis	In some fields	CASRAI, VIVO	Yes (Author clustering capabilities used to match authors with papers)
Curvita Profile Manager	Unknown	Unknown	No
CUSP - Columbia University Scientific Profiles	Unknown	Unknown	Yes
Digital Vita	Unknown	Unknown	No (but can be done manually by authors)
Elsevier's Pure (now integrated with SciVal Experts)	The "Elsevier Fingerprinting Engine" uses ten thesauri including MeSH to match and identify key concepts for an individual or group of people. Thesauri updates and expansion are ongoing.	Maps to VIVO ontology	Yes
Elsevier's SciVal	The "Elsevier Fingerprinting Engine" uses ten thesauri including MeSH to match and identify key concepts for an individual or group of people. Thesauri updates and expansion are ongoing.	Maps to VIVO ontology	Yes
Epernicus Solutions & Epernicus Network	Unknown	Unknown	No (can be done manually by authors)
ERIM Member Profile System (ERIM MIS)	Unknown	Unknown	Yes (uses author ID numbers)
Esploro	ProQuest thesaurus, ERA FOR, PQTD, and more, All thesauri are regularly updated.	Plans to implement the VIVO ontology	Yes
EUREKA! Enhancing Student Research	Unknown	Unknown	No
Expertise @ Maryland	Unknown	Unknown	Yes
Faculty Profile System	Unknown	Unknown	No
Faculty Research Information Profile (FRIP)	N/A	N/A	N/A
Faculty Scholarly Productivity Index	Unknown	Unknown	Unknown
GENIUS	Unknown	Unknown	No
Google	None (Google uses generic keywords)	Unknown	No (but can be done manually through Google Scholar "My Citations" functionality)
HUBzero	Unknown	Unknown	No
iamResearcher	Unknown	Unknown	No
iAMscientist	Unknown	Unknown	No
i2iConnect	Unknown	Unknown	No
InCites	In some fields	Unknown	No (Though InCites can accept data from ResearcherID and Converis profiling systems for disambiguation)
INDURE	Unknown	Unknown	N/A
LatticeGrid	MeSH	Uses elements of FOAF and other ontologies	No (but can be done manually by authors)
Lattes Database	Unknown	Unknown	Unknown
The Lens	Yes	Customizable data collection screens and university/institutional profiles	Yes
LinkedIn	None	Unknown	No
Life Science Network	Unknown	Unknown	No (but can be done manually)
Loki	Unknown	Unknown	Yes (uses campus directory for authentication)
Lyterati	Yes	Fully customizable ontology that maps to VIVO	Yes (using parsing algorithm on free text)
McCormick Collaboration Visualization Tool	None	Unknown	Yes
MizzouLinks	Unknown	Unknown	No
MyScienceWork	Unknown	Unknown	No
ORCID (Open Researcher and Contributor ID)	Unknown	Unknown	Yes
OSU:pro	Unknown	Unknown	Unknown
Pivot	Unknown	Unknown	Yes
Portfolio & Showroom	Yes	Yes The ontology's vocabulary is mapped to international ontologies (e.g. Getty AAT, GND, MARC Code List for Relators Scheme)	Yes (users can also differentiate manually)
Profiles	MeSH, others are being developed to go beyond the life and biomedical sciences	VIVO RDF ontology with additional Profiles RDF classes and properties	Yes Harvard Profiles uses an XML-based "disambiguation service" to import Medline publications and uses configurable heuristics in its disambiguation algorithm
ReachNC	Scopus taxonomy uses MeSH and general keywords	Maps to VIVO ontology	Yes
Research Accelerator	Unknown	Unknown	No
ResearcherID	Unknown	Unknown	No (although authors can build their publication list and manually disambiguate)
SciENcv	No thesaurus used	Unknown	No
Symplectic Elements	MeSH, Fields of Research, ScienceMetrix.	Supports mapping of publication, person and grants data to the VIVO ontology via their open source VIVO Harvester Extension, as well as Harvard Catalyst's Profiles RNS.	Yes
VIVO	VIVO uses several thesauri that are available through Semantic Web, including MeSH	The VIVO Ontology was developed and supported by NIH-funded efforts and continues to be developed and built by its open source community at GitHub and in collaboration with the eagle-i project.	Yes
Yaffle	Unknown	Unknown	Unknown

== Bibliometrics ==
This table provides information on the types of bibliometrics provided in the tool.

Bibliometrics
Research Networking Tool	h-index	Citation count	Altmetrics	SNIP and SJR	Journal Impact Factor*	Other	Notes
Academic Room							
AcademicLabs	Soon	Yes		Yes			
Activity Insight	Yes	Yes	Yes	Yes	Yes		
C-IKNOW							
PROFILES by Mentis (formerly Collaborative Partnership / Profile System)	Yes	Yes	Yes	Yes	Yes		
Community Academic Profiles - CAP							
Converis	Yes	Yes	Yes Can integrate with altmetric data feed	No	Yes	Category Normalized Citation Impact, Journal Normalized Citation Impact, Percentile in Category, Highly Cited Paper, Hot Paper, International Collaboration, Institutional Collaboration, Industry Collaboration and Open Access	
Curvita Profile Manager							
CUSP - Columbia University Scientific Profiles							
Digital Vita							
Elsevier's Pure (integrated with SciVal)	Yes	Yes	Yes Altmetric and PlumX	Yes	No	Field-weighted Citation Impact, Number of Authors, CiteScore	
Elsevier's SciVal	Yes	Yes	Yes Views data from ScienceDirect and Scopus	Yes	No	20+ indicators ranging from h, g & m indices, to Publications in Top Journal Percentiles, Field-Weighted Citation Impact, Academic-Corporate Collaboration Impact & Views per Publication	
Epernicus Solutions & Epernicus Network							
ERIM Member Profile System (ERIM MIS)							
Esploro	YesPlanned	Yes integrated with external tools	Yes	Yes planned	Yes planned	Multiple research-related indicators to measure research outputs usage and impact	
EUREKA! Enhancing Student Research							
Expertise @ Maryland							
Faculty Profile System							
Faculty Research Information Profile (FRIP)							
Faculty Scholarly Productivity Index							
GENIUS							
Google Scholar	Yes						
HUBzero							
iamResearcher							
iAMscientist							
i2iConnect							
InCites	Yes	Yes	Yes Recorded Future partnership provides customized newsfeed and institution activity from web content	No	Yes		
INDURE							
LatticeGrid							
Lattes Database							
The Lens	Yes	Yes	Yes		Yes	Patent Citations, OA-Ratio, Collaborative Ratio	
LinkedIn	No	No	None				
Life Science Network	No	No	Yes (views counts, recommendations, rating scores calculated from anonymous and non-anonymous contributions)	No	No (but journals can be entered into the database and their IF indicated)		
Loki							
Lyterati							
McCormick Collaboration Visualization Tool							
MizzouLinks							
MyScienceWork							
OSU:pro							
Pivot							
Portfolio & Showroom	No	No	No	No	No		(Note: Portfolio & Showroom deliberately dispenses with bibliometrics and focuses on alternative quality measurement methods, such as the DORA initiative)
Profiles							
ReachNC	Yes						
Research Accelerator							
ResearcherID	Yes	Yes					
SciENcv							
Symplectic Elements	Yes	Yes	Yes	Yes	Yes		
VIVO			Yes				
Yaffle							

== See also ==
- Current research information system
- Social networking service

== Bibliography ==
- Borner, K.; Contractor, N.; Falk-Krzesinski, H. J.; Fiore, S. M.; Hall, K. L.; Keyton, J.; Spring, B.; Stokols, D.; Trochim, W.; Uzzi, B. (September 2010). "A multi-level systems perspective for the science of team science". Sci Transl Med. 2 (49): 49cm24. doi:10.1126/scitranslmed.3001399. PMC 3527819. PMID 20844283.
- Contractor, NS; Wasserman, S; Faust, K (July 2006). "Testing multitheoretical, multilevel hypothesis about organizational networks: An analytic framework and empirical example". Academy of Management Review. 31 (3): 681–703. doi:10.5465/AMR.2006.21318925.
- Cressman, D., Holbrook, J.A., Lewis, B.S., and Wixted, B. (2011). Understanding the Structure of Formal Research Networks (Vancouver, BC: Simon Fraser University).
- Disis, M. L.; Slattery, J. T. (March 2010). "The road we must take: multidisciplinary team science". Sci Transl Med. 2 (22): 22cm9. doi:10.1126/scitranslmed.3000421. PMID 20374998.
- Falk-Krzesinski H, Shaw PL and Wimbiscus-Yoon L (2010). "Comparative Matrix of Research Networking Tools". (Poster presentation). National VIVO Conference: Enabling National Networking of Scientists (Queens, NY).
- Falk-Krzesinski HJ, Börner K, Contractor N, et al. (October 2010). "Advancing the science of team science". Clin Transl Sci. 3 (5): 263–6. doi:10.1111/j.1752-8062.2010.00223.x. PMC 2965626. PMID 20973925.
- Fried, NF; Gibbons, S (2005). "Understanding faculty to improve content recruitment for institutional repositories". D-Lib Magazine. 11: 1. doi:10.1045/january2005-foster. hdl:1802/1292.
- Guimerà, R; Uzzi, B; Spiro, J; Amaral, LAN (2005). "Team assembly mechanisms determine collaboration network structure and team performance". Science. 308 (5722): 697–702. Bibcode:2005Sci...308..697G. doi:10.1126/science.1106340. PMC 2128751. PMID 15860629.
- Jones, B. F.; Wuchty, S.; Uzzi, B. (November 2008). "Multi-university research teams: shifting impact, geography, and stratification in science". Science. 322 (5905): 1259–62. Bibcode:2008Sci...322.1259J. doi:10.1126/science.1158357. PMID 18845711.
- Maxmen A (April 2010). "Science networking gets serious". Cell. 141 (3): 387–9. doi:10.1016/j.cell.2010.04.019. PMID 20434976.
- Pober JS, Neuhauser CS, Pober JM (November 2001). "Obstacles facing translational research in academic medical centers". FASEB J. 15 (13): 2303–13. doi:10.1096/fj.01-0540lsf. PMID 11689456.
- Schleyer, T.; Spallek, H.; Butler, B. S.; Subramanian, S.; Weiss, D.; Poythress, M. L.; Rattanathikum, P.; Mueller, G. (2008). Requirements for expertise location systems in biomedical science and the Semantic Web. International Semantic Web Conference 2008.
- Schleyer, T.; Spallek, H.; Butler, B. S.; Subramanian, S.; Weiss, D.; Poythress, M. L.; Rattanathikum, P.; Mueller, G. (2008). "Facebook for scientists: requirements and services for optimizing how scientific collaborations are established". J Med Internet Res. 10 (3): e24. doi:10.2196/jmir.1047. PMC 2553246. PMID 18701421.
- Spallek, Heiko; Schleyer, Titus; Butler, Brian S. (2008). "Good Partners are Hard to Find: The Search for and Selection of Collaborators in the Health Sciences". 2008 IEEE Fourth International Conference on eScience. pp. 462–467. doi:10.1109/eScience.2008.105. ISBN 978-1-4244-3380-3.
- Stewart D (2011). "Enterprise content management in three easy questions". In Gartner Blog Network (Stamford, CT: Gartner).
- Stewart DL (2010). "Knowing what you know: Expertise Discovery & management - Part 1". In Connected Knowledge, DL Stewart, ed. (Portland, OR Oregon Health & Science University).
- Stewart DL (2010). "Sustaining the collaborative enterprise". In Connected Knowledge, DL Stewart, ed. (Portland, OR Oregon Health & Science University).
- Wieder B (2011). "Academic-reference firm offers $10,001 for best new research tool". In The Wired Campus, L Schamber, ed. (Washington, DC: The Chronicle of Higher Education).
- Wuchty, S.; Jones, B. F.; Uzzi, B. (May 2007). "The increasing dominance of teams in production of knowledge". Science. 316 (5827): 1036–9. Bibcode:2007Sci...316.1036W. doi:10.1126/science.1136099. PMID 17431139.
