= Consortia Advancing Standards in Research Administration Information =

- Formation: 2006; 20 years ago
- Type: 501(c)(3) nonprofit
- Legal status: Active
- Purpose: Standardization of research administration information, DOI management, contributor role taxonomy, and research-information interoperability
- Headquarters: Fairfax, Virginia, United States
- Location: United States
- Region served: Worldwide
- Products: Contributor Roles Taxonomy (CRediT), CASRAI Dictionary
- Fields: Research administration, scholarly communication, metadata standards, research data management
- Official language: English
- Main organ: CASRAI Editorial Board
- Parent organization: The Health Initiative
- Affiliations: University of Oxford, University of Edinburgh
- Website: https://casrai.org

The Consortia Advancing Standards in Research Administration Information (CASRAI) is an active non-profit organisation that focuses on reducing administrative burdens and improving reporting outcomes in research through standardization of information management. CASRAI is best known as the originator of the Contributor Roles Taxonomy (CRediT), a fourteen-role controlled vocabulary that has been adopted by major scholarly publishers worldwide and codified as the ANSI/NISO standard Z39.104-2022.

== Overview ==
CASRAI develops and maintains standard information agreements, which define the necessary data elements for key business processes in the research lifecycle and provide definitions for related terms. These standardised infrastructures developed by CASRAI can be integrated into local software systems and processes to facilitate consistent and comparable sharing of research information across the lifecycle. The standards are available in an online dictionary, facilitating the exchange of information in consistent formats including JSON-LD, RDF/Turtle, JATS XML, and CERIF-XML.

== History ==
=== Origins (2006–2014) ===
CASRAI was founded in 2006 as a community-driven initiative to address the proliferation of incompatible data formats used by funders, institutions, and publishers when reporting on the same underlying research activities. Early CASRAI working groups produced object templates and picklists for common entities in the research lifecycle — awards, output types, contributor identifiers, organisational identifiers, and licence types — many of which are now maintained as part of the CASRAI Dictionary's twenty domains.

=== The Contributor Roles Taxonomy (2012–2022) ===
The Contributor Roles Taxonomy originated at a 2012 workshop convened at Harvard University by Wellcome Trust and Harvard University Press, where editors, funders, and information scientists outlined a vocabulary that could replace the long-criticised authorship model with structured contribution attribution. The proposal was published in 2014 in Nature by Allen, Scott, Brand, Hlava, and Altman. CASRAI took on stewardship of the developing taxonomy and convened the multi-stakeholder working group that finalised the 14 contributor roles — conceptualisation, methodology, software, validation, formal analysis, investigation, resources, data curation, writing (original draft), writing (review and editing), visualization, supervision, project administration, and funding acquisition.

A full timeline of CRediT from the 2012 workshop through ANSI/NISO Z39.104-2022 is maintained on the CASRAI website.

=== Standardisation under NISO (2018–2022) ===
In 2018 the ORCID organisation integrated CRediT into its work-contribution model, allowing contributor roles to flow into individual researchers' ORCID records when assigned at submission. A formal NISO Standing Committee was established to bring the taxonomy through American National Standards Institute consensus review; this process produced ANSI/NISO Z39.104, CRediT, Contributor Roles Taxonomy, published 8 February 2022. Coincident with standardisation, the canonical machine-readable URIs for each role moved to `casrai.org/credit`.

=== Maintenance (2022–present) ===
The publication of ANSI/NISO Z39.104-2022, CRediT, Contributor Roles Taxonomy was approved by ANSI on January 14, 2022 and published by NISO on February 8, 2022. CASRAI plays no role in the taxonomy's ongoing maintenance. The CRediT taxonomy is maintained by a NISO committee organized and run by NISO. CASRAI hosts a broader CASRAI Dictionary across twenty research-administration domains. Day-to-day administration is operated by a committee of The Health Initiative with technical and editorial work coordinated through Hospital.org.uk and Pango.Network, alongside partial sponsorship from the University of Oxford and University of Edinburgh.

== Major initiatives ==
=== Contributor Roles Taxonomy (CRediT) ===
CASRAI supported the publication of Contributor Roles Taxonomy (CRediT), until it was advanced to become an ANSI/NISO standard. CRediT provides a standardised method for recognising diverse contributions to scholarly published work, defining 14 distinct roles including conceptualisation, methodology, and data curation.

Each role has a canonical machine-readable URI under `credit.niso.org`, a Schema.org DefinedTerm representation, and a JATS XML encoding via the `<role>` element with `vocab="credit"` attributes. NISO's JAT24R Recommendation JAT24R Recommendation documents the exact attribute structure required for compliant article markup. The canonical URI pointers for the CRediT terms are available on the official CRediT website. Ties the Schema.org structure for web-published articles.

Open, machine-readable distributions of the taxonomy are published as a SKOS Turtle file (RDF), a JSON-LD DefinedTermSet, and a structured JSON API, each licensed under Creative Commons Attribution 4.0 and aligned with ANSI/NISO Z39.104-2022. NISO Maintains a How to implement CRediT implementation guidance.

CASRAI also maintains a plain-language CRediT statement guide for authors and a parallel implementation guide for publishers explaining the ICMJE-authorship versus CRediT-contributorship distinction.

CASRAI has developed and provides a free Open Journal Systems (OJS) plugin that integrates the CRediT taxonomy into the journal submission process. This plugin features an artificial-intelligence server that is freely available to institutions, enabling automated CRediT taxonomy metadata assignment directly within OJS PKP article submissions. The system modifies the journal submission process by automating contributor role assignments, standardising metadata management, and streamlining workflows. It ensures compliance with CRediT standards, supports XML and PDF output formats, and integrates seamlessly with existing journal workflows.

The AI-powered plugin represents a significant advancement in making contribution data easily accessible for future research, automating the process of identifying and categorising contributor roles while ensuring that metadata is properly structured and preserved. This initiative aligns with CASRAI's mission to reduce administrative burden while improving the quality and accessibility of research contribution data.

=== CASRAI Dictionary ===
The CASRAI Dictionary is an open, CC-BY 4.0 licensed vocabulary of operational definitions used across research-administration information systems. The Dictionary is structured into twenty domain hubs aligned with the modern research lifecycle, including persistent identifiers, research data infrastructure, responsible research assessment, reproducibility, generative-AI use and disclosure, research security, and Indigenous data governance, among others. A representative dictionary entry is the FAIR principles assessment term, which carries an operational definition, examples and counter-examples, a comprehensive comparison of assessment frameworks (the Research Data Alliance FAIR Data Maturity Model, F-UJI, FAIR-Aware, CESSDA, and the Australian Research Data Commons FAIR self-assessment), JATS and JSON-LD encoding snippets, and a citable PID.

The Dictionary further includes 123 object templates (such as Award, Book, Conference Paper, and Research Dataset), each carrying a structured field list with type heuristics, definitions, and cross-references to the picklists that constrain its allowed values. Ten controlled-vocabulary picklists are published alongside, including output types, licence types, person-identifier types, organisation-identifier types, and reviewer roles.

=== Digital infrastructure and services ===
CASRAI maintains a comprehensive digital infrastructure that supports the global research community. The organisation's dictionary service provides standardised definitions and terminologies for research administration, serving as a central reference point for institutions implementing CASRAI standards. This online dictionary facilitates consistent communication across different research management systems and ensures interoperability between diverse institutional frameworks.

The organisation's infrastructure includes advanced DOI management capabilities, hosting over 200 million DOIs as of 2025. This system enables seamless integration with Crossref and other scholarly communication platforms, ensuring that research outputs are properly identified, tracked, and attributed throughout their lifecycle.

=== Crosswalks and interoperability ===
CASRAI publishes formal crosswalks mapping CRediT to other widely used metadata vocabularies, including DataCite `contributorType` (DataCite Metadata Schema 4.6), MARC 21 Relator Codes, the ORCID work-contribution model, and the Schema.org `Role` pattern. These crosswalks are designed for use by CRIS integrators, institutional repositories, and library cataloguing systems that need to ingest CRediT-tagged contributor metadata into their existing schemas.

The implementation suite further covers DataCite deposit mapping, Crossref Schema 5.5 deposit guidance, ORCID push integration, and detailed implementation playbooks for manuscript submission systems including Clarivate ScholarOne Manuscripts, Aries Editorial Manager, eJournalPress, and Open Journal Systems (OJS).

=== Reproducibility and research integrity ===
CASRAI maintains terminology and standards relating to research reproducibility, covering the reproducibility–replicability–robustness distinction (per Goodman, Fanelli and Ioannidis), reporting frameworks (the TOP Guidelines, ARRIVE 2.0, CONSORT, PRISMA, and STROBE via the EQUATOR Network), the NIH Rigor and Reproducibility policy, and the role of CRediT in supporting reproducibility through transparent contributor attribution.

=== Funder mandate tracking ===
CASRAI maintains a funder-mandate matrix tracking the position of approximately forty national, multinational, and private research funders on CRediT — including the NIH, NSF, UKRI and its seven constituent councils, Wellcome, NIHR, ERC, Horizon Europe, the Canadian Tri-Agency (CIHR / NSERC / SSHRC), ARC, NHMRC, and major private foundations such as the Gates Foundation, HHMI, and the Chan Zuckerberg Initiative.

== Adoption ==
=== Publishers ===
CRediT is supported by major commercial and society publishers, with Cell Press piloting the taxonomy from 2014 and Elsevier, Wiley, Springer Nature, Taylor & Francis, BMJ, Frontiers, the ACS, the Royal Society of Chemistry, Cambridge University Press, Oxford University Press, PLOS, and eLife among subsequent adopters. Adoption status is tracked publicly on the CASRAI adoption page alongside the underlying journal-policy citations.

=== Submission and production systems ===
Detailed implementation playbooks for the dominant manuscript submission platforms — Clarivate ScholarOne Manuscripts (used by Wiley, Sage, Taylor & Francis, and many academic societies), Aries Editorial Manager (used by Elsevier, Springer Nature, AAAS), eJournalPress, Open Journal Systems (OJS, via the Public Knowledge Project), and Manuscript One — are published as editorial-office guides.

=== Knowledge infrastructure ===
The full CASRAI Dictionary is exposed via a GraphQL API and dumped in RDF/Turtle and JSON-LD for ingestion by registries such as the Basic Register of Thesauri, Ontologies and Classifications (BARTOC) and Linked Open Vocabularies. A curated bibliography of fifty-one foundational peer-reviewed papers on CRediT, contributorship, persistent identifiers, FAIR data, responsible research assessment, and the reproducibility crisis is maintained as a citable resource.

== Training ==
CASRAI organises workshops, webinars, and training sessions to support adoption of its standards by funders, institutional research-administration offices, libraries, and publishers. These educational programmes focus on best practices in research administration and data management, and have historically been delivered through annual "ReConnect" events in the United Kingdom, Canada, and Continental Europe, and through joint sessions at RDA Plenaries and euroCRIS strategic seminars.

== Geographic implementation ==
CASRAI standards are actively used in Canada, the United Kingdom, the European Union, the United States, Australia, and increasingly in research-intensive economies in the Asia-Pacific region. Regional adoption profiles are documented in CASRAI's North America, Europe, and Asia-Pacific regional hubs. The organisation's reach extends globally through its digital infrastructure, with institutions from multiple continents accessing its dictionary services and implementing its standards.

== Impact and reach ==
CASRAI's impact on the global research ecosystem is substantial, with the organisation hosting over 200 million DOIs as of 2025, representing a significant portion of the world's scholarly output. The free availability of its OJS plugin with AI-powered metadata assignment capabilities has democratised access to advanced research administration tools, particularly benefiting smaller institutions and those in developing countries that may lack resources for proprietary solutions.

The integration with Crossref ensures that contribution data flows seamlessly through the scholarly communication ecosystem, improving the accuracy of research metrics and enabling a more nuanced understanding of collaborative research efforts. This infrastructure supports the broader movement toward open science and transparent research practices by making contribution data more accessible and standardised.

The free availability of CRediT under CC-BY 4.0 — together with the open machine-readable vocabulary distributions, JATS implementation guidance, and crosswalks to DataCite, MARC 21, ORCID, and Schema.org — supports adoption by institutions and publishers across the spectrum from large commercial publishers to small society journals and institutional repositories.

CASRAI's broader Dictionary work contributes to the wider open-science movement by providing operational definitions for emerging research-administration concepts including generative-AI disclosure, narrative CVs (the Royal Society's R4RI format), CARE principles for Indigenous data governance, machine-actionable data management plans (RDA DMP Common Standard), and the CoARA research-assessment reform agenda.

== See also ==
- Digital Object Identifier
- Research data management
- FAIR data
- San Francisco Declaration on Research Assessment (DORA)
- Open access
