= Network for Earthquake Engineering Simulation =

The George E. Brown, Jr. Network for Earthquake Engineering Simulation (NEES) was created by the National Science Foundation (NSF) to improve infrastructure design and construction practices to prevent or minimize damage during an earthquake or tsunami. Its headquarters were at Purdue University in West Lafayette, Indiana as part of cooperative agreement #CMMI-0927178, and it ran from 2009 till 2014. The mission of NEES is to accelerate improvements in seismic design and performance by serving as a collaboratory for discovery and innovation.

== Description ==
The NEES network features 14 geographically distributed, shared-use laboratories that support several types of experimental work: geotechnical centrifuge research, shake table tests, large-scale structural testing, tsunami wave basin experiments, and field site research. Participating universities include: Cornell University; Lehigh University;Oregon State University; Rensselaer Polytechnic Institute; University at Buffalo, SUNY; University of California, Berkeley; University of California, Davis; University of California, Los Angeles; University of California, San Diego; University of California, Santa Barbara; University of Illinois at Urbana-Champaign; University of Minnesota; University of Nevada, Reno; and the University of Texas, Austin.

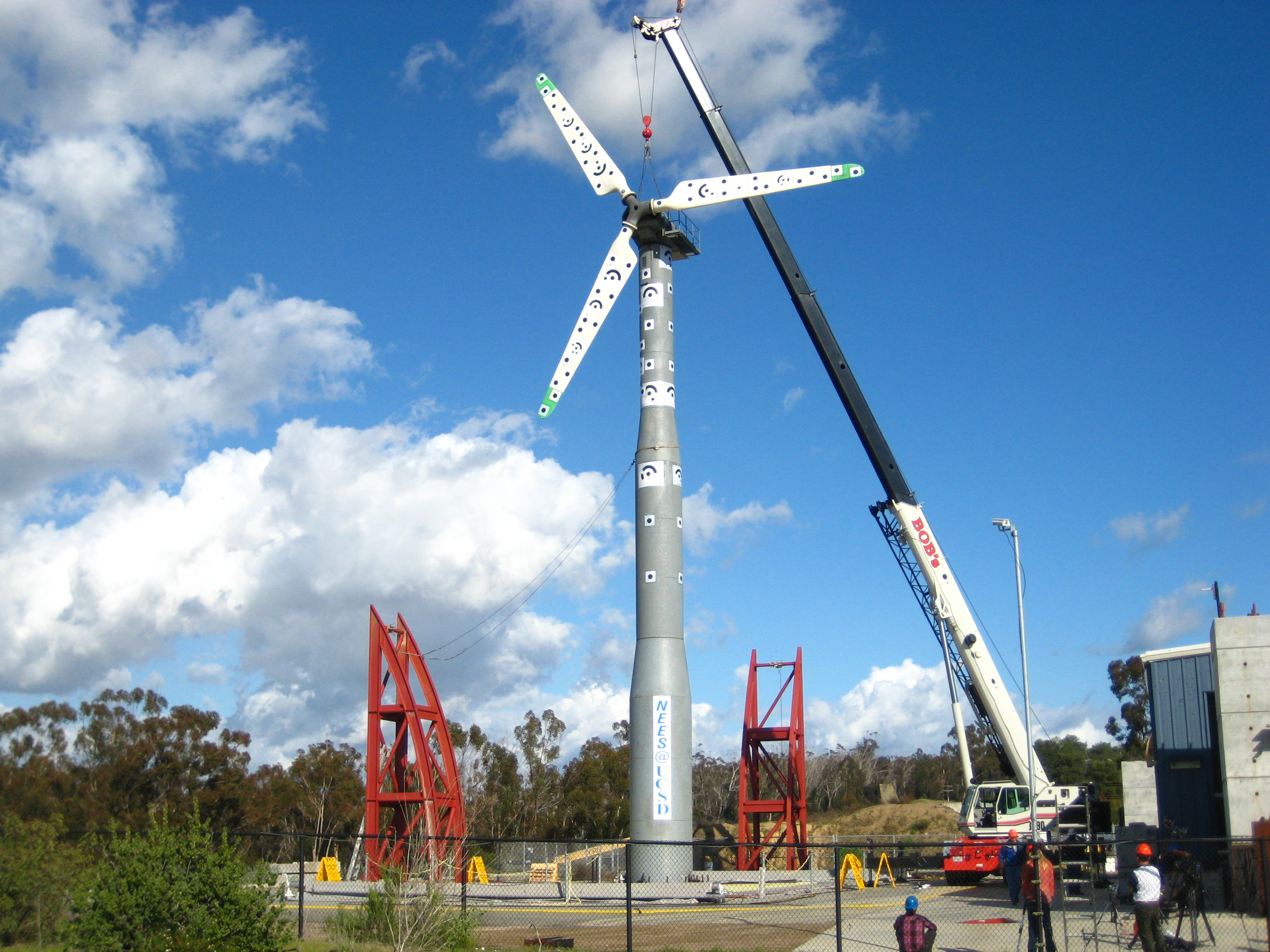
Placing the wind turbine on the NEES@UCSD table.

The equipment sites (labs) and a central data repository are connected to the global earthquake engineering community via the NEEShub, which is powered by the HUBzero software developed at Purdue University specifically to help the scientific community share resources and collaborate. The cyberinfrastructure, connected via Internet2, provides interactive simulation tools, a simulation tool development area, a curated central data repository, user-developed databases, animated presentations, user support, telepresence, mechanism for uploading and sharing resources and statistics about users, and usage patterns.

This allows researchers to: securely store, organize and share data within a standardized framework in a central location, remotely observe and participate in experiments through the use of synchronized real-time data and video, collaborate with colleagues to facilitate the planning, performance, analysis, and publication of research experiments and conduct computational and hybrid simulations that may combine the results of multiple distributed experiments and link physical experiments with computer simulations to enable the investigation of overall system performance. The cyberinfrastructure supports analytical simulations using the OpenSees software.

These resources jointly provide the means for collaboration and discovery to improve the seismic design and performance of civil and mechanical infrastructure systems.

== Cyberinfrastructure ==
Cyberinfrastructure is an infrastructure based on computer networks and application-specific software, tools, and data repositories that support research in a particular discipline. The term "cyberinfrastructure" was coined by the National Science Foundation.

== Projects ==
NEES Research covers a wide range of topics including performance of existing and new construction, energy dissipation and base isolation systems, innovative materials, lifeline systems such as pipelines, piping, and bridges, and nonstructural systems such a ceilings and cladding. Researchers are also investigation soil remediation technologies for liquefiable soils, and collecting information about tsunami impacts and building performance after recent earthquakes. The permanently instrumented field sites operated by NEES@UCSB support field observations of ground motions, ground deformations, pore pressure response, and soil-foundation-structure interaction.

The NEESwood project investigated the design of low and mid-rise wood-frame construction in seismic regions. The NEES@UCLA mobile field laboratory, consisting of large mobile shakers, field-deployable monitoring instrumentation systems, was utilized to collect forced and ambient vibration data from a four-story reinforced concrete (RC) building damaged in the 1994 Northridge earthquake. Shake table tests on pipe systems anchored in a full-scale, seven-story building performed on the Large High-Performance Outdoor Shake Table at NEES@UCSD investigated seismic design methods for anchors fastening nonstructural components.

== Education, outreach, and training ==
The NEES collaboratory includes educational programs to meet learning goals and technology transfer for various stakeholders. Programs include a geographically distributed Research Experience for Undergraduates (REU) program, museum exhibits, an ambassador program, curriculum modules, and a Research to Practice webinar series aimed at informing practicing engineers of the outcomes of NEES research.

Companion cyberinfrastructure provides a framework for helping educators to enrich their curriculum with these resources. NEESacademy, a portal within NEEShub, is designed to support effective organization, assessment, implementation, and dissemination of learning experiences related to earthquake science and engineering. One source of content is the education and outreach products developed by NEES researchers, but anyone can contribute resources.

== Soil liquefaction research ==
The George E. Brown, Jr. Network for Earthquake Engineering Simulation (NEES) hosts two geotechnical centrifuges for studying soil behavior. The NEES centrifuge at University of California Davis has radius of 9.1 m (to bucket floor), maximum payload mass of 4500 kg, and available bucket area of 4.0 m2. The centrifuge is capable of producing 75g's of centrifugal acceleration at its effective radius of 8.5 m. The centrifuge capacity in terms of the maximum acceleration multiplied by the maximum payload is 53 g x 4500 kg = 240 g-tonnes. The NEES centrifuge at the Center for Earthquake Engineering Simulation (CEES) at Rensselaer Polytechnic Institute has a nominal radius, 2.7 m, which is the distance between the center of payload and the centrifuge axis. The space available for the payload is a depth of 1,000 mm, width of 1,000 mm, height of 800 mm, and a maximum height of 1,200 mm. The performance envelope is 160 g, 1.5 tons, and 150 g-tons (product of payload weight times g).
