= ScholarMate =

- Website type: professional Social network platform for researchers
- Headquarters: Hong Kong, China
- Area served: Worldwide
- Creator: Prof. Calvin Ma
- Website: http://www.scholarmate.com
- Users: 8,000,000 (research_groups = 100,000)
- Launched: 2007

ScholarMate (Chinese: 科研之友; pinyin: kē yán zhī yǒu) is a professional research social network platform. ScholarMate has over 8 million registered members and more than 100,000 research groups.

== History ==
Proposed by Professor Jian Ma in 2006, it was launched in 2007. ScholarMate's goal is to make research easy by encouraging people to collaborate, communicate and share information on the platform.

== Features ==
ScholarMate is a platform for sharing publications and disseminating research outputs. Using techniques of big data analytics, researchers can receive recommendations on relevant opportunities based on their profiles. Registered users can easily share their publications with their peers so as to create impact and increase citations using the research social network platform.

ScholarMate provides personalized services for status updates, research profiles, publications, and funding opportunities etc., it allows researchers to create groups for their projects and courses. Over 100,000 research groups have been created for collaboration, communication and sharing of research resources. Partnership with CrossRef, ScholarMate also provides services for DOI registrations and updating citations.

== ScholarMate Institutional Edition ==
ScholarMate Institutional Edition (SIE or referred to as Research Online) is a social institutional repository. Launched in 2007, SIE has been used to support the annual research assessment exercise and 2013/2014 Research Assessment Exercises in City University of Hong Kong.

Using standard API, ScholarMate Institutional Edition (SIE) can be integrated with Current Research Information System (CRIS) in research institutions.

Since 2009, Research Online has been used in the National Natural Science Foundation of China (NSFC) to facilitate researchers in grant application, and progress/final reports. It has been integrated with the Internet-based Science Information System (ISIS) to provide reliable research outputs for project management in NSFC.

Since 2010, several government funding agencies have used the SIE for finding experts and for supporting the workflow of R&D project management, including Department of Science and Technology in Shaanxi, Guangdong, Jiangxi, Guangxi, and Hainan, etc.
