= EuroCRIS =

euroCRIS is an international not-for-profit association founded in 2002 in order to bring together experts on research information management and research information management systems (CRIS). The euroCRIS Office is located in Nijmegen (Netherlands).

euroCRIS maintains the CERIF standard (for Common European Research Information Format) to enable CRIS system interoperability. CERIF is endorsed by the European Commission and is developed and maintained by the CERIF Task Group of euroCRIS.

The mission of euroCRIS is to foster cooperation and knowledge-sharing across the worldwide research information community and to promote interoperability of research information through the CERIF standard. Additional areas of activity also include – among others – the uptake of CRIS systems by various stakeholders, research information infrastructures on an institutional, regional, national and international level, best practices in system interoperability and the use and implementation of standards in CRIS such as identifiers, formats, semantics, (controlled) vocabularies, etc.

A key instrument for the community-driven information exchange are the international events regularly organised by euroCRIS. These include the biennial CRIS Conferences and the biannual Membership Meetings. The outputs arising from all these events are systematically archived in the euroCRIS open access repository based on a DSpace-CRIS software platform. In 2020 the organization took over the Fairfax, Virginia operation of Consortia Advancing Standards in Research Administration Information. The most recent euroCRIS event after a two-and-a-half-year hiatus due to the Covid-19 pandemic was the CRIS2022 Conference held May 12-14, 2022 in Dubrovnik (Croatia).

== The euroCRIS DRIS ==
One of the main areas of activity of euroCRIS involves maintaining the Directory of Research Information Systems (DRIS). The DRIS is an international directory of CRIS systems currently displaying (as of June 2022) close to 1,200 entries. The vast majority of DRIS records describe institutional CRISs, but there is also a good number of instances for regional and national CRISs, disciplinary and research funder CRISs. Details for new DRIS entries are usually provided by institutions or CRIS vendors, so the DRIS remains work in progress at this stage: while it already provides a comprehensive snapshot of the available CRIS infrastructure worldwide, it is far from being complete yet.

== See also ==
- Current research information system
- Comparison of research networking tools and research profiling systems
