= Digital researcher =

A Digital researcher is a person who uses digital technology such as computers or smartphones and the Internet to do research (see also Internet research). Digital research differs from Internet research in that digital researchers use the Internet as a research tool rather than the Internet itself as the subject of study. A digital researcher seeks knowledge as part of a systematic investigation with the specific intent of publishing research findings in an online open access journal or by other social media information exchange formats.

Although digital research can be both quantitative and qualitative, it does not necessarily follow strict Internet research ethics using the formal scientific method, as it involves collaboration using social media with public input for research and knowledge mobilization. There are a number of objections to this stance, which are all relevant to Wikipedia research and research ethics, for example the blurring of public and private spaces on the internet.

Digital research may also be formally published in academia through peer-reviewed journals or through the further use of social media. Digital researchers are involved with basic research or applied research using data analysis software which includes, but is not limited to, SPSS or JMP.

The term Digital Research was originally used to describe a now defunct company created by Dr. Gary Kildall to market and develop his CP/M operating system and related products. It was the first large software company in the microcomputer world.

The term Digital Researcher was also used by UK researcher development organization Vitae to form an event for postgraduate researchers and research staff focusing on the use of technology by researchers for collaboration, information gathering, and dissemination. The event encouraged researchers to become digital researchers.
