= Crossref =

Nonprofit open digital infrastructure organization

- Publishers International Linking Association Inc. d.b.a Crossref
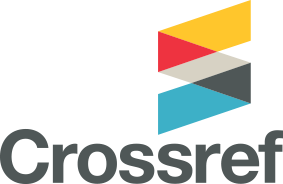
- Formation: 1999; 27 years ago
- Legal status: 501(c)(6) organization
- Headquarters: Lynnfield, Massachusetts, U.S.
- Executive Director: Ed Pentz
- Chair: Lisa Schiff, California Digital Library
- Revenue: US$13.3 million (2024)
- Expenses: US$10.5 million (2024)
- Website: www.crossref.org

Crossref (formerly styled CrossRef) is a nonprofit open digital infrastructure organization for the global scholarly research community. It is the largest digital object identifier (DOI) Registration Agency of the International DOI Foundation. It has 23,000 members from 164 countries representing publishers, libraries, research institutions, and funders and was launched in early 2000 as a cooperative effort among publishers to enable persistent cross-platform citation linking in online academic journals. As of July 2023, Crossref identifies and connects 150 million records of metadata about research objects made openly available for reuse without restriction. They facilitate an average of 1.1 billion DOI resolutions (clicks of a DOI link) every month, and they see 1 billion queries of the metadata every month.

== Background ==
Crossref is a nonprofit association of approximately 19,000 voting members made up of 6,000 societies and publishers, including both commercial and nonprofit organizations, 6,500 academic and research institutions, research funders, museums, repositories, government agencies and NGOs. Crossref includes members with varied business models, including those with both open access and subscription policies. Crossref does not provide a database of fulltext scientific content. Rather, it facilitates the links among distributed content hosted at other sites through the use of open metadata and persistent identifiers.

Crossref interlinks millions of items from a variety of content types, including journals, books, conference proceedings, research grants, working papers, technical reports, and data sets. Linked content includes materials from scientific, technical, and medical (STM), and social sciences and humanities (SSH) disciplines. Crossref's sustainability model includes an annual membership fee, a per-record registration fee, and additional service fees, while all the metadata remains open without restriction. Crossref provides the technical and business infrastructure to provide for this infrastructure using digital object identifiers (DOIs). Crossref provides a query service for its records through an open REST API and a Search form.

In addition to the technology and metadata linking scholarly objects, Crossref enables a common linking contract among its participants. Members agree to assign DOIs to their current journal content, and they also agree to link from the references of their content to the content of other publishers. This reciprocity is an important component of what makes the system work.

Non-member organizations may participate in Crossref by integrating the metadata. Such organizations include libraries, online journal hosts, linking service providers, secondary database providers, search engines, and providers of article discovery tools.

Crossref announced the adquisition of "Retraction Watch" database in September 2023 and released it as a public resource. And since January 2025 retractions and corrections are available in the Crossref REST API.

== Metadata ==
When a scholarly journal publishes an article, typically the publisher will enter the following information about the article into Crossref: journal name, article DOI, publication date, journal volume, issue, and page, URL of article as well as journal, and number of pages. Optional metadata that can be entered includes the text of the article abstract, ORCID iDs of the authors, funding information, including funder registry IDs and funding award numbers, license information, and similarity check URLs.

The references cited by a work can also be added. This contributes to the Crossref Cited-by service, which allows one to see what articles have cited another. Most major scholarly publishers do provide the references to each of their articles - Elsevier was a major holdout but began providing references in 2021.

Crossref does not currently support adding information about the role of each author or other contributor to an article, but this feature is planned to be released in 2025, at least for CRediT information.

== Services ==
In addition to maintaining scholarly records, Crossref provides additional services such as plagiarism screening, searching by funding, and a button on article pages and PDFs to determine the status of an item, such as whether it has been corrected or retracted.

=== Crossmark ===
The Crossmark update system facilitates updates, corrections, and retractions for the scholarly community. The reader simply clicks on the Crossmark button to view status information about the document. If an update exists, the status information will include a DOI link to the statement of correction or retraction.

Crossmark provides a cross-platform way for readers to quickly discover the status of a research output along with additional metadata related to the editorial process. Crucially, the Crossmark button can also be embedded in PDFs, which means that members have a way of alerting readers to changes months or even years after it's been downloaded.

— Crossref

Crossmark also allows publishers to link publications about a clinical trial, such as those reporting its results, to the registration for that clinical trial.

== Challenges ==
In June 2024 a paper got wider audience when a team of researchers found fabricated metadata entered into the Crossref database, in the case of the analyzed publisher 9% of the references were wrong. This then also got sourced into datasets like Openalex. Metadata in the reported examples does not contain the real citations any more, but made up citations.

== Awards ==
In September 2012, Crossref was awarded the Association of Learned and Professional Society Publishers (ALPSP) Award for Contribution to Scholarly Publishing. According to ALPSP, "With over 4,000 participating publishers, Crossref's reach is international and it is very well regarded not just amongst publishers, but also the literary community and researchers. Crossref has built on this unique position to offer other services such as Crossref Cited by Linking, CrossCheck, CrossMark and the latest project, FundRef. Crossref's services provide solutions that are best done collectively by the industry to improve scholarly communications."

The Council of Science Editors (CSE) awarded Crossref its Award for Meritorious Achievement at the CSE annual meeting in May 2009. This was only the second time the award had been presented to an organization rather than to an individual.

In September 2008, ALPSP awarded Crossref its Innovation in Publishing award for the CrossCheck plagiarism screening service powered by iThenticate. In 2025, to mark the organisation's 25th anniversary, they launched their own Crossref Metadata Awards to emphasize their community’s role in stewarding and enriching the scholarly record. The six winners selected on the basis of the overall highest coverage of metadata elements included in Participation Reports.

== See also ==
- ScholarMate
