= Current research information system =

A current research information system (CRIS) is a database or other information system to store, manage and exchange contextual metadata for the research activity funded by a research funder or conducted at a research-performing organisation (or aggregation thereof). CRIS systems are also known as Research Information Management or RIM Systems (RIMS).

== Features ==
The data model underpinning a CRIS relies on a set of basic entities as defined by the Common European Research Information Format model maintained by the non-profit organisation euroCRIS.

The links connecting these entities provide a standardised semantic layer that provides consistency to the data model. The basic CERIF entities are people, organisations, projects and outputs (publications, research data, patents). Further second-level entities in the comprehensive snapshot of research provided by CERIF are for instance funding, research facilities and equipment or skills.

System interoperability lies at the core of CRIS operation, both from an internal and an external viewpoint. Internally, information is exchanged between the multiple information-gathering systems at institutions (HR systems, project management tools, finance management systems, etc.) and the one-stop-shop CRIS where all the institutional research information is kept. From an external interoperability perspective, metadata need to be exchanged between the systems at research-performing organisations where the research is actually conducted and the systems run by research funders and governmental bodies in charge of research assessment processes. By providing a standard approach to information description, the CERIF model becomes a key feature for enabling this system interoperability.

A particularly important area of system interoperability is CRIS/IR interoperability, i.e. the information exchange workflows between Current Research Information Systems and Institutional Repositories. While these two kinds of systems were once seen as competing with each other, nowadays they tend to work together via efficient mechanisms for information exchange around research outputs and their associated metadata. Recent developments in furthering the interoperability between these systems has led to their merging into a single CRIS/repository systems. This is the so-called CRIS/repository integration.

CRIS surveys are regularly conducted in order to capture a snapshot of what is traditionally a swiftly evolving landscape. In 2016 EUNIS and euroCRIS carried out a survey and published a report on CRIS/IR interoperability in Europe. An extension of this survey was jointly conducted by OCLC Research and euroCRIS on a worldwide basis in 2018 that resulted in the Dec 2018 report “Practices and Patterns in Research Information Management: Findings from a Global Survey”. Besides highlighting the key influence of national-level research assessment exercises on the availability of CRIS systems in a country, the report states the intention of their authors to carry out regular updates for the survey in order to examine the landscape evolution in a number of areas.

== Use case ==
The scope of CRIS systems may be institutional, funder-operated, regional, national or supranational. From a system perspective, they can be commercial platforms provided by vendors, in-house-built systems or community-driven open source platforms. Most CRIS platforms have associated national- or international user groups where institutions running them discuss their performance and enhancements.

A Directory of Research Information Systems (DRIS) is maintained by euroCRIS. Traditionally limited to euroCRIS members, this directory is currently being expanded to all available CRIS systems, focusing for starters on the ones available in Europe.

Among the key applications of the aggregated pool of research information collected in CRIS system it’s worth mentioning the following areas.

=== Research assessment ===
As mentioned in the “Practices and Patterns” report, research assessment is one of the key drivers for the implementations of CRIS systems, especially at research-performing organisations. This is due to the need for all institutional research outputs to be collected and described in a standardised way in a single institutional system that is also able to gather information on impact indicators. A particularly important example of this connection is the UK Research Excellence Framework (REF), whose 2014 edition resulted in a widespread adoption of commercial CRIS systems by UK institutions.

=== Research administration ===
As a one-stop-shop for storing all the information related to the institutional research activity, CRIS systems play a key role in the area of research administration by institutional Research Offices. Among many others, this involves aspects such as:

- Research impact and its analysis
- Research collaborations across institutions and with Industry
- Preparation of project proposals and subsequent management of awarded grants
- Knowledge Exchange

=== Open Science implementation ===
Where available, CRIS systems are often key components in the Open Science implementation strategy at research-performing organisations due to their systematic use for collecting information on all research outputs produced at institutions.

=== Business intelligence ===
Their comprehensive aggregation of contextual research information makes CRISs very suitable tools for extracting business intelligence indicators for decision-making purposes at institutions and beyond. Emerging areas of work like the Knowledge Exchange Framework (KEF) in the UK provide further practical applications for these systems.

== See also ==
- Institutional repository
- Open archive
- Comparison of research networking tools and research profiling systems
- ScholarMate
