= Contributor Roles Taxonomy =

Standard for indicating roles in scientific publications

The Contributor Roles Taxonomy, commonly known as CRediT, is a controlled vocabulary of 14 distinct types of contributions to a scholarly research project. CRediT is commonly used by scientific journals to indicate what each author of a research article did.

== Overview ==
The Contributor Roles Taxonomy (CRediT) is a standardized list of 14 different ways that people contribute to research projects. For scientific journals and other venues that use CRediT, it provides a way for the researchers and others associated with a project to indicate their role in the project. According to the CRediT website, "CRediT is not designed to determine authorship but to provide more information about the specific contributions of authors" (emphasis in the original).

CRediT defines 14 distinct contributor roles, organized into four functional categories, without hierarchy. Contributors can hold multiple roles, and not every role must be filled in every research project.

=== Planning & design roles ===
- Conceptualization: Ideas; formulation or evolution of overarching research goals and aims. Includes developing research questions, formulating hypotheses, and identifying gaps in existing knowledge that the research will address.
- Methodology: Development or design of methodology; creation of models. Encompasses designing experimental protocols, analytical frameworks, and theoretical models that guide the research process.
- Software: Programming, software development; designing computer programs; implementation of the computer code and supporting algorithms; testing of existing code components. Covers all computational tool development necessary for conducting or analyzing the research.

=== Research & analysis roles ===
- Validation: Verification, whether as a part of the activity or separate, of the overall replication/reproducibility of results/experiments and other research outputs. Ensures research findings are reliable, replicable, and meet quality standards.
- Formal Analysis: Application of statistical, mathematical, computational, or other formal techniques to analyze or synthesize study data. Includes all quantitative and qualitative analytical work performed on collected data.
- Investigation: Conducting a research and investigation process, specifically performing the experiments, or data/evidence collection. The hands-on work of executing experiments, surveys, observations, and other data-gathering activities.
- Resources: Provision of study materials, reagents, materials, patients, laboratory samples, animals, instrumentation, computing resources, or other analysis tools. Providing the physical, biological, or computational resources necessary for the research.
- Data Curation: Management activities to annotate (produce metadata), scrub data and maintain research data (including software code, where it is necessary for interpreting the data itself) for initial use and later re-use. Organizing, maintaining, and documenting data to ensure its long-term utility and reproducibility.

=== Communication roles ===
- Writing – Original Draft: Preparation, creation and/or presentation of the published work, specifically writing the initial draft (including substantive translation). Creating the first complete version of the manuscript or major sections thereof.
- Writing – Review & Editing: Preparation, creation and/or presentation of the published work by those from the original research group, specifically critical review, commentary or revision – including pre- or post-publication stages. Refining, revising, and improving the manuscript through editorial work and critical feedback.
- Visualization: Preparation, creation and/or presentation of the published work, specifically visualization/data presentation. Creating figures, charts, diagrams, and other visual elements that communicate research findings.

=== Management roles ===
- Supervision: Oversight and leadership responsibility for the research activity planning and execution, including mentorship external to the core team. Providing guidance, mentorship, and strategic direction for the research project and team members.
- Project Administration: Management and coordination responsibility for the research activity planning and execution. Handling logistics, timelines, communications, and organizational aspects of the research project.
- Funding Acquisition: Acquisition of the financial support for the project leading to this publication. Securing grants, contracts, or other funding sources that enable the research to be conducted.

CRediT also provides for indicating the degree of contribution ("lead", "equal", or "supporting") for each contributor. Unlike the 14 contribution categories, the NISO standard describes this as optional for CRediT users to implement.

The CRediT standard includes machine-readable metadata. Each role has a unique identifier URL for use in structured metadata.

The taxonomy is an open standard conforming to the OpenStand Principles, and is published under a CC-BY Creative Commons licence.

== History ==
Replacing traditional authorship roles with contributorship had been proposed as early as 1997, and the practice was being adopted in the 2000s. The Contributor Roles Taxonomy (CRediT) was developed to address the limitations of traditional author lists, which often fail to accurately represent the diverse contributions of researchers. It originated from a 2012 workshop hosted by the Wellcome Trust and Harvard University, bringing together researchers, publishers, and funders to improve how individual contributions are documented.

In 2012, a draft taxonomy was created at a workshop held at Harvard involving biomedical scientists, publishers, and research funders.

In 2014, the Consortia Advancing Standards in Research Administration Information (CASRAI) took leadership of the CRediT initiative, forming a working group of publishers, funders, and university representatives to refine and formalize the taxonomy. Under CASRAI's stewardship, CRediT was formally introduced in 2015 and has since been actively promoted by CASRAI for adoption by publishers and research organizations worldwide.

By 2017, the PLOS journals and eLife had adopted CRediT, and in 2018 it was endorsed by representatives of the National Academy of Sciences. Over the next several years, many of the largest publishers of scientific journals began using CRediT.

Interest in CRediT increased in 2020 following grant support from the Wellcome Trust and the Alfred P. Sloan Foundation, which aimed to expand its use and encourage further awareness, advocacy, and standardization.

In 2022, CRediT became an ANSI/NISO standard, including metadata for use in the JATS XML version of scholarly articles (ANSI/NISO z39104-2022-credit).

== Name variation ==
The unabbreviated name of CRediT is variably presented with the second word being either "Role" or "Roles". CRediT was initially presented in the scholarly literature as the "Contributor Role Taxonomy". However, the original website for CRediT (https://casrai.org/credit/) used the plural form "Contributor Roles Taxonomy" since its inception in October 2015. Thus, articles about CRediT used the plural form (e.g.,). A second website for CRediT (https://credit.niso.org/) used the plural form from its debut in 2020 until the end of July 2024, when the site was updated and the name was changed to "Contributor Role Taxonomy". Confusingly, the NISO publication that established CRediT as an American National Standard uses the plural form.

== Technical implementation ==
=== Supported schema formats ===
NISO provides comprehensive technical specifications for representing CRediT taxonomy data in four primary formats, ensuring compatibility with diverse systems and platforms:

==== XML Schema ====
Structured format designed for publication systems and manuscript submission platforms. Enables standardized data exchange and integration with traditional publishing infrastructure, particularly JATS XML (Journal Article Tag Suite).

Example JATS XML with individual role term identifiers:

<contrib-group>
  <contrib contrib-type="author">
    <name>
      <surname>Smith</surname>
      <given-names>Jane A.</given-names>
    </name>
    <role vocab="credit"
          vocab-identifier="https://casrai.org/credit/"
          vocab-term-identifier="https://casrai.org/credit/roles/conceptualization/">
      <role-term>Conceptualization</role-term>
    </role>
    <role vocab="credit"
          vocab-identifier="https://casrai.org/credit/"
          vocab-term-identifier="https://casrai.org/credit/roles/formal-analysis/">
      <role-term>Formal Analysis</role-term>
    </role>
  </contrib>
</contrib-group>

The vocab-term-identifier attribute provides a unique URL for each specific CRediT role, enabling precise machine-readable identification and linking to role definitions.

==== JSON Schema ====
Web application format commonly used in modern research infrastructure, APIs, and web-based submission systems. Provides lightweight, easily parsed representation suitable for contemporary software architectures.

==== JSON-LD (Linked Data) ====
Supports semantic interoperability, integration with knowledge graphs, and linked data queries. Enables CRediT data to be connected with broader scholarly infrastructure and semantic web technologies.

==== Schema.org integration ====
Enables compatibility with search engines and knowledge graphs for enhanced discoverability. Allows CRediT information to be indexed by Google Scholar, Microsoft Academic, and other discovery platforms.

== Limitations ==
CRediT was originally created with the intention of being used for the contributions of both authors named on the byline of a scholarly article and other contributors mentioned in the Acknowledgments section. However, most scholarly publishers have implemented CRediT only for authors, not for acknowledgees. These non-author contributions include technical support, manuscript drafting by a medical writer, translating, and editing by an authors' editor. By ignoring the contributions of acknowledged non-authors, publishers' implementation of CRediT “induces named authors to attribute these roles to themselves, thus creating the potential for contradictory or misleading information to be passed on to readers and research evaluators.” Some of the contributions made by acknowledgees may not be described well by CRediT, and even for authors the CRediT categories may be too coarse, prompting proposals for revisions and extensions to CRediT.

In a study of one psychology research project, independent researchers read detailed descriptions of other researchers' contributions. The results indicated that the independent researchers had low agreement about both the number and type that the contributions should be classified into.

As the International Committee of Medical Journal Editors has pointed out, documenting contributions with CRediT or another scheme "leaves unresolved the question of the quantity and quality of contribution that qualify an individual for authorship", suggesting that authorship guidelines are still necessary, although authorship guidelines also typically fail to specify the quantity of contribution required.

== See also ==
- Consortia Advancing Standards in Research Administration Information (CASRAI)
- ORCID
- Open science
- Academic authorship
