= Scipinion =

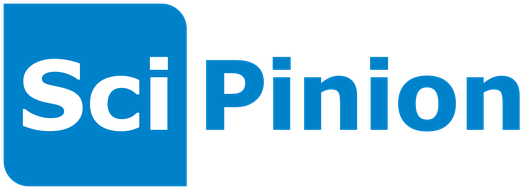
- Logo used from 2014
- Type: Private
- Founded: 2014; 12 years ago
- Headquarters: Bozeman, Montana
- Website: scipinion.com

SciPinion is an organization specializing in scientific peer review services. Founded in 2014, SciPinion provides expert review services through a network of subject matter experts using a modified Delphi methodology. The organization aims to reduce uncertainty in scientific decision-making by providing decision-makers with expert scientific opinions derived from an objective process.

== History ==
SciPinion was founded in 2014 by Sean Hays, PhD and Chris Kirman and is headquartered in Bozeman, Montana. Both founders had extensive backgrounds in scientific consulting, particularly in toxicology and chemistry, with over forty years of combined experience. Hays has published over 100 peer-reviewed publications in toxicology, risk assessment, and exposure assessment, and has served on EPA advisory committees including the Clean Air Scientific Advisory Committee (CASAC). The organization was established to address challenges they had identified in scientific decision-making processes, specifically the uncertainty caused by limited access to experts and the lack of systematic, objective methods for consolidating expert input.

After identifying these issues, Hays and Kirman developed SciPinion with the objective of aggregating collective expertise from leading scientists to reduce uncertainty in both public and private sector decision-making. The company built a technological platform designed to minimize bias and negative influences that can affect discussions of controversial scientific topics. This platform was created to provide experts with a psychologically safe environment for sharing their insights.

== Overview ==
SciPinion specializes in peer review services for scientific research. The organization maintains a network of tens of thousands of subject matter experts who conduct reviews of scientific materials. SciPinion works with researchers, scientific organizations, and other entities requiring scientific peer review services.

== Mission and Purpose ==
SciPinion's stated mission is "to introduce clarity and certainty from the expert community to the world's toughest science problems, instilling universal trust in science." The organization aims to provide objective scientific insights to key decision-makers by leveraging its network of scientific experts and proprietary technology platform. According to SciPinion, this approach helps reduce uncertainty and facilitates more rapid and informed decision-making on a global scale.

The company emphasizes adherence to high ethical and professional standards in its operations. SciPinion's primary focus is on creating a system that allows for the collection and consolidation of expert scientific opinions while minimizing potential biases that can influence scientific discourse. The organization describes its purpose as becoming "the most trusted source for understanding the collective wisdom of the world's experts and the go-to resource for companies and organizations seeking independent input from the scientific community."

== Methodology ==
SciPinion employs a modified Delphi process for conducting scientific peer reviews. This methodology is designed to produce reproducible and trusted results in scientific evaluation. The organization utilizes proprietary technology to facilitate the review process and manage its network of scientific reviewers.

In 2019, SciPinion's methodology was described in a peer-reviewed publication in the journal Regulatory Toxicology and Pharmacology titled "Science peer review for the 21st century: Assessing scientific consensus for decision-making while managing conflict of interests, reviewer and process bias." The paper outlines SciPinion's approach to scientific consensus building and peer review, focusing on methods to manage conflicts of interest and reduce various forms of bias in the review process.

== Features and Services ==
SciPinion offers several key services and features:

- Expert Reviewer Network: The organization maintains a community of tens of thousands of subject matter experts across various scientific disciplines.
- Efficient Review Process: SciPinion provides peer review services with rapid turnaround times while maintaining quality standards.
- Modified Delphi Methodology: Their review process is based on a modified Delphi approach that aims to ensure reproducible and reliable results.
- Integrated Technology Platform: SciPinion uses proprietary technology to connect reviewers and manage the peer review process.

== Recognition ==
The U.S. Environmental Protection Agency (EPA) Office of Inspector General published a report in 2022 that compared SciPinion's peer review process with the EPA's FIFRA Science Advisory Panel (SAP) process. The report acknowledged that SciPinion's process met or exceeded the EPA's process in every point of comparison.

== Organization ==
As of 2025, SciPinion's leadership team includes:

- Sean Hays - CEO
- Chris Kirman - CSO
- Tyler Carneal - COO

== Notable Projects ==
SciPinion has been involved in several scientific advisory projects, including:

- NIOSH Nanoparticle PBPK Modeling (2024): A SciPinion expert panel provided advice to the National Institute for Occupational Safety and Health (NIOSH) on physiologically based pharmacokinetic (PBPK) modeling of nanoparticles. This work was documented in a 2024 publication in the journal Nanotoxicology.
- No Significant Risk Levels for Lower Acrylates (2024): SciPinion organized an expert panel to review and derive no significant risk levels (NSRLs) for three lower acrylates under California's Proposition 65. The panel's conclusions and recommendations were published in Regulatory Toxicology and Pharmacology.
- Exposure Model Peer Review Guidelines (2022): SciPinion convened an advisory panel to develop best practices for the peer review of exposure models. The panel's recommendations were published in Regulatory Toxicology and Pharmacology, providing guidance on improving the quality and reliability of exposure model review processes.
