= European University Information Systems organisation =

European University Information Systems
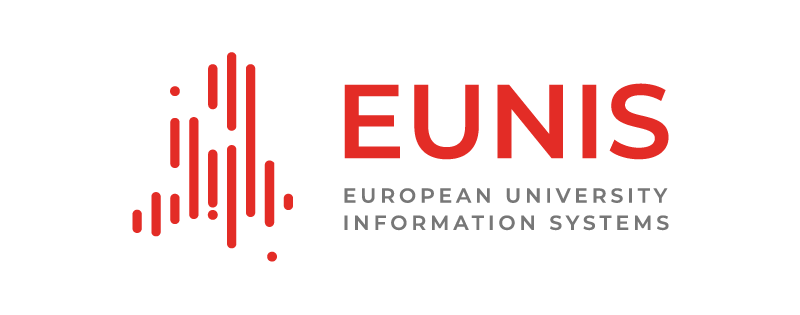
- Formation: 1993
- Headquarters: Paris, France
- President: Raimund Vogl (Term of office: June 2021)
- Vice-Presidents: Pekka Kähkipuro, Tomasz Szmuc (Term of office: June 2021)
- Others: Yiannis Salmatzidis (Treasurer), Outi Tasala (Secretary), Thierry Koscielniak (Vice-secretary)
- Website: www.eunis.org

EUNIS is the European University Information Systems organisation. Their mission is to help member institutions develop their IT landscape by sharing IT knowledge and experience and working together. The association counts more than 2,000 people from 120 different European Institutions and 18 National/Regional Organizations across 36 Countries.

EUNIS brings together those who are responsible for the management, development and the policy for Information Technology in Higher Education in Europe. Members of EUNIS are generally high level professionals actively seeking collaboration activities and networking opportunities. The objective of EUNIS is to contribute to the development of high-quality information systems. To achieve this, the aims of EUNIS are:

- encourage exchange, cooperation and debates between those responsible for information systems in higher education or research institutes/organizations within Europe.
- establish relationships with supervisory organizations in charge of information systems in higher education and in research institutes in each country as well as at European level.

== History ==
European University Information Systems (EUNIS) was created in 1993, after an Organization for Economic Co-operation and Development (OECD) study on "Impact of Information Technology on Higher Education". EUNIS creation meetings, held in Amsterdam and Paris, were attended by scholars from Belgium, Denmark, Finland, France, Germany, Ireland, the Netherlands and the United Kingdom.

EUNIS has been officially registered in France in 1998, after a first General Assembly held during the 1997 Conference in Grenoble.

== Activities ==
Special Interest Groups, or Task Forces, gather around dedicated subjects (Learning & Teaching, Benchmarking, Student Mobility, Business Intelligence, Cloud Management, Information Security and Enterprise Architecture). A SIG/TF is one of the links between EUNIS, its members and prospective members, both public sector and private sector and is the mechanism that transforms the theories discussed during events into concrete activities.

Events are organized throughout the year:

One of the main EUNIS activity is its Annual Congress. This event is attended by up to 400+ delegates from more than 30 countries. During the Congress, awards are presented for selected papers and projects, including the Elite Award, the Dørup E-learning Award and the Best Paper Award.

Every two years EUNIS organises the Rectors' Conference which is attended by 100+ Presidents, Vice-Presidents, Provosts, Vice‑Chancellors and Rectors from many HE institutions across Europe and beyond.

EUNIS has organized a number of other events in recent years, mainly workshops and webinars in relation with the EUNIS Special Interest Groups and Task Forces.

Research and Analysis (ERAI) is an initiative developed to aggregate to a European level the applied researches being developed within each country institution. It offers a platform where all High Education actors can find IT experts information and share IT trends and best practices.

Through ERAI, EUNIS provides case studies from specific countries, compare studies between two or several countries, share contributions coming from Members, write EUNIS' articles, publish and promote surveys and analysis of the Special Interest Groups.

EUNIS closely cooperates with IT business corporations, and with a number of National, European and International Institutions and Organizations in the field of education and research.
