= HUBzero =

Open source software platform

HUBzero is an open source software platform for building websites that support scientific activities. The platform allows individuals to create web sites that connect a community in scientific research and educational activities. HUBzero is released under various open source licenses.

== History ==
HUBzero was created by researchers at Purdue University in conjunction with the NSF-sponsored Network for Computational Nanotechnology. It was based on the Purdue University Network Computing Hubs (PUNCH) project that had begun in the 1990s under Mark Lundstrom, Josef Fortes, and Nirav Kapadia.

HUBzero sites combine Web 2.0 concepts with middleware that provides access to interactive simulation tools including access to TeraGrid, the Open Science Grid, and other national grid computing resources. The software later became supported by a consortium and used for some other projects.

== Services ==
HUBzero provides free preconfigured virtual machines images that contain the full version of the HUBzero platform. The HUBzero Essential instance is also available through Amazon Web Services. HUBzero also offers two paid services, the HUBzero Foundation and a No Hassle Hosting service.

== Technology ==
The website is built from open-source software: the Linux operating system, the Apache web server, the MySQL database, the Joomla content management system, and the PHP web scripting language. The HUBzero software allows individuals to access simulation tools and share information. Sites using the hub infrastructure are standardized with the following modules:

- Built-in user support features
- Statistics about users and usage patterns
- Integrations with Google Drive, GitHub, and Dropbox
- Interactive simulation tools, hosted on the hub cluster and delivered to web browsers
- Simulation tool development area, including source code control and bug tracking
- Space for teams to collaborate and build communities through Groups and Projects
- Video seminars and animated presentations connected to an online course feature
- Mechanism for uploading and sharing resources

== See also ==
- PHPEclipse
