= List of search engines =

Search engines, including web search engines, selection-based search engines, metasearch engines, desktop search tools, and web portals and vertical market websites have a search facility for online databases.

== By content/topic ==
=== General web search ===
Name	Language	Data Source
Baidu	Chinese	Baidu
Brave Search	Multilingual	Brave
Dogpile	English	Metasearch engine
DuckDuckGo	Multilingual	Multiple
Ecosia	Multilingual	Google and Microsoft Bing
Excite	Multilingual	Microsoft Bing
Google	Multilingual	Google
Kagi	English	Metasearch engine and Kagi
Lycos	Multilingual	Microsoft Bing
MetaCrawler	English	Metasearch engine
Microsoft Bing	Multilingual	Microsoft Bing
Mojeek	Multilingual	Mojeek
Petal	Multilingual	Huawei
Qwant	Multilingual	Microsoft Bing
Sogou	Multilingual	Tencent
Startpage	English	Google
Swisscows	Multilingual	Microsoft Bing
WebCrawler	English	Microsoft Bing
Yahoo! Search	Multilingual	Microsoft Bing
Yandex	Multilingual	Yandex
Yep	English	Yep
You.com	English	Microsoft Bing

=== Open Source ===
Name	Language	License
Elasticsearch	Multilingual	Elastic License
Elasticsearch	Multilingual	Server Side Public License
Elasticsearch	Multilingual	GNU Affero General Public License
Opensearch	Multilingual	Apache License 2.0
YaCy	Multilingual	GNU GPL-2.0-or-later
Marginalia	English. Experimental: Swedish, German, French	GNU Affero General Public License

=== Geographically localized ===
Name	Language	Country
BIGLOBE	Japanese	Japan
Daum	Korean	Korea
Nate	Korean	Korea
Egerin	Kurdish	Sweden
Fireball	German, English	Germany
Goo	Japanese	Japan
Leit.is	Icelandic, English	Iceland
Najdi.si	Slovenian	Slovenia
Naver	Korean	Korea
Parsijoo (defunct)	Persian	Iran
Pipilika (defunct)	Bengali, English	Bangladesh
Rambler	Russian	Russia
Rediff		India
SAPO	Portuguese	Portugal
Search.ch		Switzerland
Sesam (defunct)		Norway, Sweden
Seznam	Czech	Czech Republic
Walla!		Israel
Yahoo Japan	Japanese	Japan (Google backend)
Yongzin	Tibetan	China

=== Business ===
- Business.com
- Daily Stocks
- GlobalSpec
- Thomasnet (United States)
- Justdial (India)

=== Computers ===
- Shodan (website)

=== Content ===
- Openverse, search engine for open content.

=== Dark web ===
- Ahmia

=== Education ===
- BASE (search engine)
- Google Scholar
- Internet Archive Scholar
- Library of Congress
- Semantic Scholar

=== Enterprise ===
- Apache Solr
- Oracle Secure Enterprise Search 10g
- Q-Sensei: Q-Sensei Enterprise
- Swiftype: Swiftype Search
- TeraText: TeraText Suite

=== Events ===
- Tickex (US, UK)
- TickX (UK, Ireland, Spain, Netherlands)

=== Food and recipes ===
- RecipeBridge: vertical search engine for recipes (now defunct)
- Yummly: semantic recipe search (now defunct)

=== Genealogy ===
- Mocavo.com: family history search engine

=== Job ===
- Adzuna (UK)
- CareerBuilder (US)
- Craigslist (by city)
- Dice.com (US)
- Glassdoor (US)
- Indeed (US)
- JobStreet.com (Southeast Asia, Japan, India)
- Monster.com (US), (India)
- Naukri.com (India)
- Yahoo! HotJobs (Country-wise subdomains, International)

=== Legal ===
- Google Patents
- Google Scholar
- Lexis (Lexis Nexis)
- Quicklaw
- WestLaw

=== Medical ===
- Bing Health
- Bioinformatic Harvester
- CiteAb (antibody search engine for medical researchers)
- EB-eye EMBL-EBI's Search engine
- Entrez (includes PubMed)
- GenieKnows
- Healia
- Healthline
- Nextbio (Life Science Search Engine)
- PubGene
- Searchmedica
- WebMD

=== Mobile/handheld ===
- Taganode Local Search Engine (now defunct)
- Taptu: taptu mobile/social search (now defunct)

=== News ===
- Bing News
- Google News
- Dailyhunt (India)
- Priyo
- Yahoo! News

=== People ===
- Whitepages
- FindFace
- PeekYou
- Spokeo
- Zabasearch.com
- ZoomInfo

=== Real estate/property ===
- HotPads.com
- Realtor.com
- Redfin
- Rightmove
- StuRents.com
- Trulia
- Zillow
- Zoopla

=== Television ===
- TV Genius

=== Video ===
- Sepia Search

=== Video games ===
- Wazap

== By data type ==
Search engines dedicated to a specific kind of information

=== Datasets ===
- Google Dataset Search

=== Maps ===
- Baidu Maps
- Bing Maps
- Géoportail
- Google Maps
- MapQuest
- Nokia Maps
- OpenStreetMap
- Petal Maps
- Qwant Maps (defunct)
- Tencent Maps
- Wikiloc
- WikiMapia
- Yahoo! Maps
- Yandex Maps
- MapmyIndia

=== Multimedia ===
- Bing Videos
- blinkx
- FindSounds
- Google Images
- Google Video
- Munax's PlayAudioVideo
- Openverse, search engine for open content.
- Podscope
- SeeqPod
- Sepia Search
- Songza
- Tencent Video
- TinEye
- Veveo
- Yahoo! Video

=== Price ===
- Bing Shopping
- Google Shopping (formerly Google Product Search and Froogle)
- Idealo
- Kelkoo
- MySimon
- PriceGrabber
- PriceRunner
- Pronto.com
- Shopping.com
- Shopzilla
- TickX

=== Source code ===
- Google Code Search
- Koders
- Krugle

=== BitTorrent ===
These search engines work across the BitTorrent protocol.

- BTDigg
- Isohunt - discontinued
- Mininova - discontinued
- The Pirate Bay
- TorrentSpy - discontinued
- Torrentz - discontinued

=== Blog ===
- Amatomu
- Bloglines
- IceRocket
- Marginalia
- Mojeek (substack only)
- Munax
- Regator
- Technorati

== By model ==
=== Search appliances ===
- Fabasoft
- Searchdaimon
- Thunderstone

=== Desktop search engines ===
Desktop search engines listed on a light purple background are no longer in active development.

Name	Platform	Remarks	License
HP Autonomy	Windows	IDOL Enterprise Desktop Search, HP Autonomy Universal Search.	Proprietary, commercial
Copernic Desktop Search	Windows	Major desktop search program. The full trial version downgrades after the trial period automatically to the free version, which is (anno 2018) limited to indexing a maximum of 10.000 files.	Proprietary (30 day trial)
DocFetcher	Cross-platform	Open-source desktop search tool for Windows and Linux, based on Apache Lucene	Eclipse Public
dtSearch Desktop	Windows		Proprietary (30 day trial)
Everything	Windows	Find files and folders by name instantly on NTFS volumes	Freeware
GNOME Storage	Linux	Open-source desktop search tool for Unix/Linux	GPL
Google Desktop	Linux, macOS, Windows	Integrates with main Google search engine page; discontinued by Google September 14, 2011	Freeware
ISYS Search Software	Windows	ISYS:Desktop search software	Proprietary (14-day trial)
KRunner	Linux		
Locate32	Windows	Graphical port of Unix's locate & updatedb	BSD
Lookeen	Windows	Desktop search product with Outlook plugin and limited support for other formats via IFilters, uses Lucene search engine.	Proprietary (14-day trial)
Nepomuk	Linux	Open-source semantic desktop search tool for Linux. Has been replaced by Baloo in KDE Applications from release 4.13 onward.	Mix of SA 3.0 and GNU Free Documentation v1.2
Recoll	Linux, Unix, Windows, macOS	Open-source desktop search tool for Unix/Linux	GPL
Spotlight	macOS	Found in Apple macOS "Tiger" and later OS X releases.	Proprietary
Strigi	Linux, Unix, Solaris, macOS, Windows	Cross-platform open-source desktop search engine. Unmaintained since 2011-06-02.	LGPL v2
Terrier Search Engine	Linux, macOS, Unix	Desktop search for Windows, Mac OS X Tiger, Unix/Linux.	Mozilla Public v1.1
Tracker	Linux, Unix	Open-source desktop search tool for Unix/Linux	GPL v2
Tropes Zoom	Windows	Semantic Search Engine (no longer available)	Freeware and commercial
Unity Dash	Linux	Was part of Ubuntu Desktop	GPL v3, LGPL v2.1
Windows Search	Windows	Part of Windows Vista and later OSs. Available as Windows Desktop Search for Windows XP and Server 2003. Does not support indexing UNC paths on x86-64 systems.	Proprietary
X1 Desktop Search	Windows	Major desktop search product along with Copernic Desktop Search	Proprietary (14-day trial)

=== Child-safe search engines ===
- Kiddle
- KidRex
- QwantJunior
- Swisscows

=== Metasearch engines ===
Name	Language
Dogpile	English
Excite	English
Info.com	English
Kayak.com	Multilingual
MetaCrawler	English
MetaGer	Multilingual
Mobissimo	Multilingual
Otalo.com	English
PCH Search and Win	
SearXNG	Multilingual
Skyscanner	Multilingual
Wego.com	Multilingual

=== Natural language ===
- Bing (Semantic ability is powered by Powerset)
- Lexxe
- Perplexity.ai
- SearchGPT

=== Open-source search engines ===
- ht://Dig
- Isearch
- Lemur Toolkit & Indri Search Engine
- Lucene
- mnoGoSearch
- Nutch
- Openverse
- Recoll
- Searchdaimon
- SearXNG
- Seeks
- Sphinx
- SWISH-E
- Terrier Search Engine
- Xapian
- YaCy
- Zettair

==== Web search engine ====
- Gigablast
- Grub

=== P2P search engines ===
Name	Language
Seeks (open-source)	English
YaCy (free and fully decentralized)	Multilingual

=== Privacy search engines ===
- Brave Search
- DuckDuckGo
- HotBot
- Kagi
- MetaGer
- Mojeek
- Presearch
- Qwant
- SearXNG
- Startpage.com
- Swisscows
- You.com
- Epic (web browser)

=== Social and environmental focus ===
- Ecosia

=== Semantic browsing engines ===
Name	Description	Speciality
Evi	Specialises in knowledge base and semantic search	answer engine
Yummly	Semantic web search for food, cooking, and recipes	food related

=== Social search engines ===
- ChaCha Search
- Delver
- Eurekster
- Facebook Search
- Mahalo.com
- Rollyo
- Sproose
- Trexy

=== Usenet ===
- Google Groups (formerly Deja News)

=== Visual search engines ===
- FindFace
- Grokker
- Macroglossa
- TinEye
- Viewzi

== Defunct or acquired search engines ==
Name	Backend ownership	Demise
iWon	Ask.com	Shut down after AT&T merger
Teoma	Ask.com	Merged to Ask.com which still uses its algorithms
A9.com	Microsoft Bing	Redirect to Amazon homepage (parent company)
AOL	Google until 2015, then Microsoft Bing	Merged to Yahoo!
Alexa Internet	Microsoft Bing	Bought by Amazon in 1999, shut down in 2021
Ciao!	Microsoft Bing	Shut down in 2018
Ms. Dewey	Microsoft Bing	January 2009
Groovle	Google	Taken over by Google after Google sued for name similarity
Mamma.com	Copernic	
MySpace Search	Google	Function taken over by Google in 2006
Mystery Seeker	Google	Novelty "search"; went offline in 2017
Netscape	Google	Now redirects to AOL
Ripple	Google	as of 2017 at the latest
Ecocho	Google, then Yahoo!	
Forestle	Google, then Yahoo!	Redirected to Ecosia in 2011
Searx	open-source	SearXNG is defacto successor
Yippy	IBM Watson	Re-branded in 2023 as Togoda.com
Grams	Grams (anonymous owner)	Closed in 2017
Gigablast	English	Website went offline in 2023, as reported by Mojeek.

- AlltheWeb (acquired by Yahoo!)
- AltaVista (acquired by Yahoo! in 2003, shut down in 2013)
- Ask.com (originally Ask Jeeves), shut down by IAC in 2026.
- Bixee.com (India) (acquired by Ibibo)
- Blekko (acquired by IBM in 2015 for its use for Watson-based products)
- BlogScope (acquired by Marketwire)
- BRS/Search (now OpenText Livelink ECM Discovery Server)
- Btjunkie
- Cuil (patents acquired by Google after shutdown)
- DeepPeep
- Direct Hit Technologies (acquired by Ask Jeeves in January, 2000)
- Getit Infoservices Private Limited
- Google Answers
- GoPubMed
- hakia
- IBM STAIRS
- Infoseek (acquired by Disney)
- Inktomi
- Ixquick (merged into Startpage)
- Jubii
- Kartoo
- LeapFish
- Lotus Magellan
- MetaLib
- mozDex
- Munax
- Myriad Search
- Neeva (acquired by Snowflake)
- Overture.com (formerly GoTo.com, now Yahoo! Search Marketing)
- PubSub
- RetrievalWare (acquired by Fast Search & Transfer and now owned by Microsoft)
- Scroogle (Google Scraper)
- Singingfish (acquired by AOL)
- Soso
- Speechbot
- Sphere (acquired by AOL)
- Startpage (acquired by System1, an advertising company)
- Tafiti (replaced by Microsoft Bing)
- Volunia
- Wikia Search
- WiseNut
- World Wide Web Worm

== See also ==
- List of academic databases and search engines
- List of web directories
- Search aggregator – Type of metasearch engine
- Search engine optimization – Practice and strategies of increasing online visibility
- Category:Search engine software
