= Lookeen =

Lookeen Desktop Search
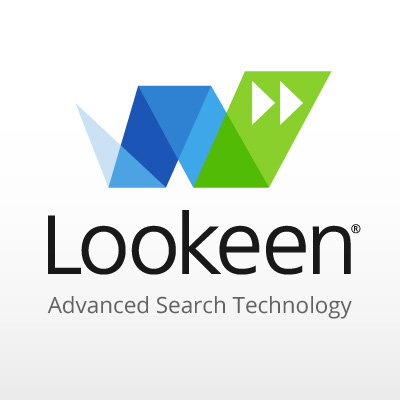

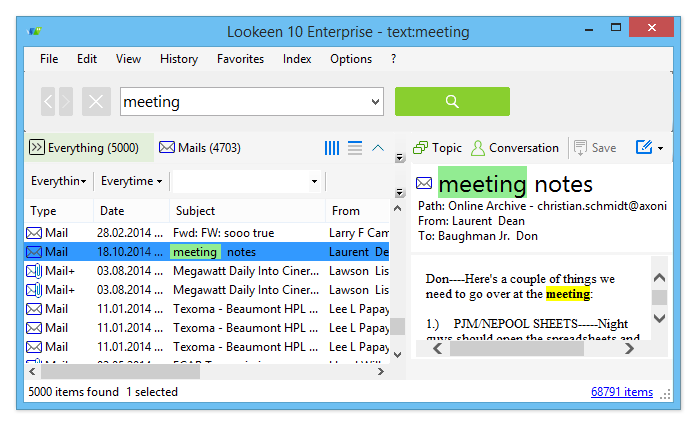
- Lookeen desktop search results - screenshot
- Developer: Axonic Informationssysteme GmbH
- Stable release: 12.0.1.6400 / 7 June 2020; 6 years ago
- Operating system: Microsoft Windows
- Available in: English, German
- Type: Desktop search, enterprise search
- Website: lookeen.com

Lookeen is an enterprise search and desktop search product released in 2008 by Axonic Informationssysteme GmbH.

== History ==
Lookeen was developed in 2007 as an email search tool replacement for Lookout, which left the market when it was purchased by Microsoft. Lookeen enables users to search for files on their local drives, Microsoft Outlook and Microsoft Exchange Server files, and any connected network drives from standard or virtual desktops.

Lookeen won the About.com Reader's Choice award for Best Outlook Add-In in 2010 and 2011, and has been reviewed by PCMagazine, The Atlantic, Inc Magazine, PCWorld, and Ghacks, among others Lookeen was also one of 29 productivity apps recommended in an article on TechCrunch in September 2015. Lookeen was also mentioned as a 3rd party search utility by The New York Times in December 2016.

== How it works ==
Lookeen is built upon the open source software, Lucene. The index framework builds an inverted index to allow fast full text searches within indexed content. Lookeen uses Microsoft add-in technology to integrate a search bar and ribbon into the Outlook client.

== Development status ==
Axonic launched enterprise search capabilities in 2012 with Lookeen Server, a Microsoft server-based index which can deliver search results to multiple desktop clients. A free version, Lookeen Free, was released in 2015.

== Competitors ==
- Copernic Desktop Search
- Docfetcher
- Everything
- FileSeek
- Locate32
- X1 Technologies
- Xobni

== See also ==
- Desktop search
- Enterprise search
- Desktop virtualization
- List of desktop search engines
- List of search engines
