= DtSearch =

dtSearch Corp.
- Type: Private
- Industry: Software
- Founded: 1991; 35 years ago
- Headquarters: Bethesda, Maryland, US
- Key people: David Thede, President
- Website: www.dtsearch.com

dtSearch Corp. is a software company which specializes in text retrieval software. It was founded in 1991, and is headquartered in Bethesda, Maryland. Its current range of software includes products for enterprise desktop search, Intranet/Internet spidering and search, and search engines for developers (SDK) to integrate into other software applications.

== History ==
dtSearch Corp was founded by David Thede; the company started research and development in text retrieval in 1988 and incorporated in Virginia in 1991 as D T Software. Marketing of dtSearch 1.0 a DOS Text Retrieval software product began in the first quarter of 1991. Initially it was distributed as Association of Shareware Professionals-approved shareware. The product was featured in an article entitled "Text Retrieval Software" in an early edition of PC Magazine as a shareware alternative to the commercial products reviewed; these included ISYS, ZyIndex, Strix, askSam, ideaList, Assassin PC, Folio Views and Lotus SmartText.

In the first few years after its initial release, dtSearch was an end-user application only. Then, in 1994, Symantec approached dtSearch about including its search technology into one of the first applications for 32-bit Windows; the dtSearch end-user application was developed into a Dynamic-link library (DLL) which Symantec embedded in Norton Navigator, which was released alongside Microsoft’s initial release of its 32-bit Windows operating system, Windows 95.

In 2007 the company was listed in the EContent 100 list, a list of companies that matter most in the digital content industry.

== Products ==
The current (2024.01) product range is Unicode-based and has an index that can handle over 1 TB of data per index.

=== Products for End-users ===
- dtSearch Desktop with Spider – Windows client Desktop search software (32-bit and 64-bit indexers)
- dtSearch Network with Spider – as dtSearch Desktop but licensed for Network use (32-bit and 64-bit indexers)
- dtSearch Web with Spider – browser based search-only client for Intranet/Internet usage based on Microsoft IIS (32- and 64-bit indexers)

=== Products for Software Developers ===
- dtSearch Engine for Windows – SDK with C++, .NET, COM, Java, Delphi APIs (32-bit and 64-bit versions)
- dtSearch Engine for Linux – SDK with C++ and Java APIs
- dtSearch Engine for Mac – SDK with C++ and Java APIs
- dtSearch Publish – a search front-end for CD/DVD publishing (32- and 64-bit indexers)
- Document Filters – included with all products but available for separate licensing.

== See also ==
- Enterprise search
- List of search engines#Desktop search engines
- List of search engine software#Commercial
