= List of business and financial search engines =

This is a list of vertical search engines focusing on business and financial content.

Name	Searchable Content
FinanSearch	Business and financial news
GenieKnows	Local businesses
GlobalSpec	Engineering and industrial products
Fintel.io	SEC and other regulatory filings search
IFACnet	Accounting information
LexisNexis	Legal, business, and public records
ThomasNet	Industrial products and related catalogs, press releases, and blogs

== Defunct Business Search Engines ==
- Business.com
