= Shustir =

Defunct American online retail website company

- Company type: Private company
- Industry: Online retail
- Founded: 2009; 16 years ago
- Founders: Shulammite Kim and Khanh Pham
- Defunct: 2014
- Fate: Unknown
- Headquarters: United States
- Area served: United States
- Products: Online selling web site
- Website: shustir.com Archived January 7, 2014, at the Wayback Machine

Shustir was an American website that connected small businesses with consumers who preferred to buy locally, and from independent retailers and professionals. It enabled small businesses to set up virtual storefronts to sell their goods and services, improve visibility in search engines, and communicate with prospective customers and clients through community building and social networking.

The site earned revenue through sales of display advertising and monthly premium storefront subscriptions.

== History ==
On May 28, 2009, Co-founders Shulammite Kim and Khanh Pham launched Shustir.com. Prior to starting Shustir.com, Kim and Pham were former colleagues in the Lehman Brothers Global Real Estate Group and worked as senior investment professionals for over eight years prior to the firm's collapse in 2008.

Kim and Pham developed Shustir.com to meet the need of small businesses to have a web presence. Only a reported 44% of small businesses had website even though 92% of all online consumers tended to shop locally (source: WebVisible/Nielsen Online) Despite the recession's onset, online sales increased in 2008.

Shustir.com was a Web 2.0 marketplace that combines e-commerce functionality with social media and social networking tools to form a platform for small businesses to not only sell their goods and services online to increase their revenues, but also to connect with more consumers beyond their geographic locales and grow their businesses.

The site was geared to help consumers find and buy from local and independent businesses, citing growing desires to keep money in local communities and obtain higher-quality products and services. Studies conducted by Civic Economics have found that spending with local businesses returns a majority of each dollar received back to their own communities.

The site was funded from the principals' personal savings and a private angel investor. The site was taking off-line in 2014.
