= ISYS =

ISYS may refer to:

- An interactive tool for in situ identification of fish and plankton in the ocean
- ISYS Search Software, a desktop and enterprise search product
- Isys, a suite of CRM software
