= Myriad (disambiguation) =

A myriad is 10,000 or an indefinitely large number.

Myriad may also refer to:

== Computing ==
- Marconi Myriad, an early computer
- Myriad Group, a Swiss software company
- Myriad Search, a metasearch engine
- Myriad, a processor by Movidius

== Literature ==
- Myriad Editions, a British publishing house
- Myriad (Image Comics), a fictional character
- Myriad, a character in the "Bloodlines" DC Comics story arc
- Myriad, an anthology comic book series published by Approbation Comics

== Music ==
- The Myriad, an American band
- Myriads, a Gothic metal band from Norway
- MYRIAD, a performance installation accompanying the 2018 album Age Of

== Other uses ==
- Myriad (area), a unit of area
- Myriad (typeface)
- "Myriad" (Supergirl), an episode of Supergirl
- Myriad Botanical Gardens, in Oklahoma City, U.S.
- Myriad CIWS, a close-in weapon system
- Myriad Convention Center, now Cox Convention Center, in Oklahoma City, U.S.
- Myriad Genetics, an American molecular diagnostic company
- Myriad Islands, in Antarctica
- Myriad Pictures, an American entertainment company
- Myriad year clock, a universal clock
- Myriad Games, publisher of the video game Caltron 6 in 1

== See also ==
- Myriade, a European miniaturized satellite platform
