= Marginalia (search engine) =

Indie search engine

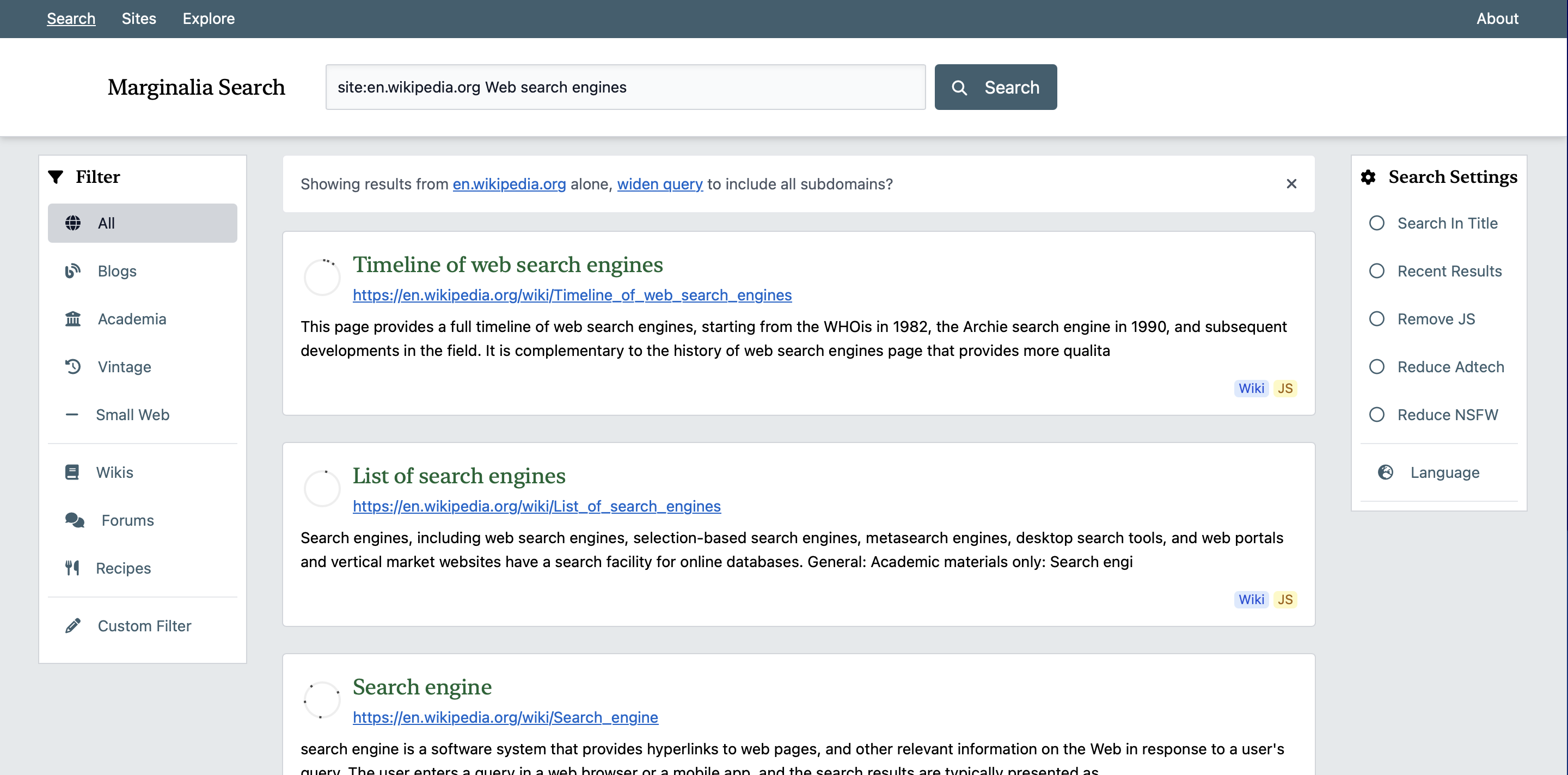
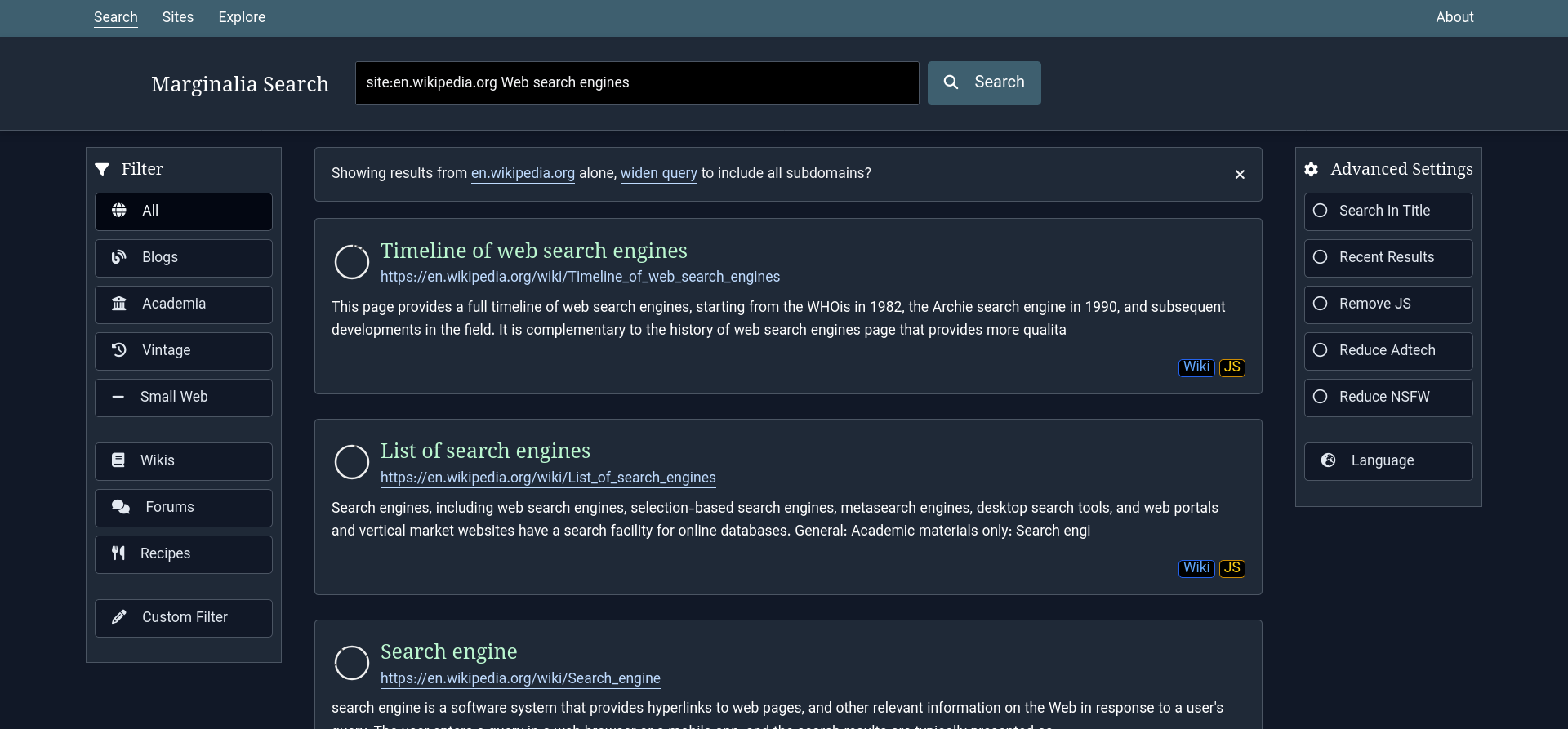
- Marginalia Search results for "web search engine" in English Wikipedia
- Website type: Web Search Engine
- Available in: English
- Owner: Viktor Löfgren
- Creator: Viktor Löfgren
- Founder: Viktor Löfgren
- Website: marginalia-search.com
- IPv6 support: Yes
- Advertising: None
- Commercial: No
- Registration: None
- Launched: 2021; 5 years ago
- Current status: Online
- Written in: Java; C++; Python

Marginalia is an indie search engine that prioritizes text-heavy non-commercial websites. It was created by Swedish software engineer Viktor Löfgren in 2021. Marginalia has its own web crawler and builds its own index instead of reusing a larger search engine's index like from Google or Bing.

Marginalia is a keyword-based search engine, unlike other search engines that use natural language processing for queries. Löfgren says it takes him about an hour a week to maintain, and he runs it on his own, low-powered hardware. Marginalia began its development in 2021 as a project to pass the time during the COVID-19 pandemic.

One way websites are added to the index is through community contributions to a public git repository. Marginalia is open source under the AGPL 3 license, and can be self-hosted.

== Features ==
Search result entries include an 'info' link to further information on the entry's website, a small visualization of where on the page keywords were found, and information about the page's use of affiliate links and JavaScript. In addition to informing users of these aspects, users can filter sites with certain features out of search results. It is possible to filter out results for pages that use features like affiliate links, tracking links, or JavaScript.

Marginalia offers an API to allow searches to be executed programmatically.

== See also ==
- Blog
- IndieWeb
- Kagi
- List of search engines
- YaCy. An open source decentralized search engine
