= ISYS:Desktop =

Desktop search tool

ISYS:desktop is an enterprise-class desktop search tool designed to find information on individual PCs as well as across corporate networks, databases and proprietary systems. It was originally introduced in 1989 by ISYS Search Software as a search and retrieval tool for MS-DOS. While the personal was available the Enterprise Edition was required to search content repositories such as Documentum, SharePoint and Interwoven.
