= Tropes Zoom =

Desktop search engine

Tropes and Zoom
- Developers: Pierre Molette, Agnès Landré, Rodolphe Ghiglione
- Release: November 10, 1994
- Stable release: 8.4.2 / February 18, 2014; 12 years ago
- Operating system: Windows, Mac and Linux under Wine (software)
- Size: 65.0 MB (per language)
- Available in: English, French, Spanish, Portuguese, Romanian
- Type: Semantic analysis
- License: Free License (BSD-like)
- Website: www.semantic-knowledge.com

Tropes Zoom was a desktop search engine and semantic analysis software from Acetic/Semantic-Knowledge. Originally written by Pierre Molette in 1994 in partnership with University Paris 8, it was the first search engine based on semantic networks to be widely known.

Unlike other search engines, Tropes Zoom suggested that the user replace each identified word with a hypernym. Thus, the search is not carried out directly on the words chosen, but on the totality of their semantic equivalents. It let users group files together by subject, and analyze all the texts dealing with one or several themes within a large collection of documents.

Since 2011, Tropes is available as free software under a variant of BSD license, but Tropes Zoom is not available.

== Tropes Zoom features ==
The Tropes Zoom suite for Microsoft Windows consisted of five components:

- Tropes, a text analysis and semantic classification software.
- Zoom, a semantic search engine.
- An integrated web crawler, to collect Internet content.
- An integrated report writer.
- An optional web module (web repository generator).

== Tropes text analysis ==
Tropes is a semantic analysis software designed to extract relevant information from texts. It uses several analysis tools and techniques including:

- Word-sense disambiguation
- Summarization and text style identification
- Word categorization
- Natural language Ontology manager
- Chronological analysis
- Real-time graphs and hypertext navigation

This software was initially developed in 1994 by Pierre Molette and Agnès Landré on the basis of the work of Rodolphe Ghiglione.

Since June 2013, Tropes V8.4 can export results formatted for Gephi (network analysis and visualization software).

== See also ==
- Desktop search
- List of desktop search engines
- Text mining
