= GenieKnows =

Vertical search engine company

- Type: Private
- Industry: Internet
- Founded: Halifax, Canada (1999)
- Founder: Rami Hamodah & John Manning
- Headquarters: Halifax, Nova Scotia, Canada
- Products: Search Engine
- Revenue: US$8,400,000 (2007), ▲19% from 2006
- Number of employees: 5 (2012)
- Parent: GenieKnows Inc.
- Website: www.genieknows.com

GenieKnows Inc. was a privately owned vertical search engine company based in Halifax, Nova Scotia. It was started by Rami Hamodah who also started SwiftlyLabs.com and Salesboom.com. Like many internet search engines, its revenue model centers on an online advertising platform and B2B transactions. It focuses on a set of search markets, or verticals, including health search, video games search, and local business directory search.

== Technologies ==
=== Local Business Directory Search ===
In 2005, GenieKnows entered the search engine market with a local business directory search engine. Targeting only the United States in its beta release, the local search engine is similar to Google Maps but uses the proprietary GeoRank algorithm to associate potentially uncategorized web pages containing addresses with businesses listed in an internet Yellow Pages directory by extracting addresses and geocoding these to identify geographic coordinates for which it associates the web page.

On February 29, 2008, GenieKnows Local was launched as a completely revised local search engine extending beyond the 100 most populous US cities covered in its beta release. The local search engine utilizes processed municipal business data, road network data, national park data, and geocoding technology to provide localized search results ranked according to a business's relevance to a user's web query. As of the February 2008 release, the engine covers over 90% of Canadian and US municipalities with populations above 1000 residents.

According to SEO and search marketing commentator Jim Hedger, GenieKnows' strongest, most unusual and important product is its local search engine.

=== Vertical Search Engine ===
GenieKnows entered the vertical search market in 2006 with a vertical search engine for video games-related web pages and another for health-related web pages.

Web pages often describe or discuss a particular topic. In information retrieval and machine learning literature, classification algorithms have been used to automatically identify the subject matter of a web page. GenieKnows uses such algorithms as a focused crawler to download web pages, identify pages that are on topic with the vertical, then index and save those pages.

The result is a search engine that contains only web pages that are on a given topic, tailoring to a niche market of web users who have an interest in a given topic, so all pages returned for a query will be on topic with the vertical being used. For revenue generation, the engine displays advertisements beside the search results from a network of advertisers where it receives pay per click. GenieKnows is collaborating with Yahoo! to display targeted, contextualized advertisements to a targeted market of users.

In February 2008, GenieKnows added online community functionality to its vertical search engine. Users sharing interest in a topic can communicate and contribute content to the site in a manner similar, but on a smaller scale, to those of Facebook, and Yahoo.

== Company ==
=== Accomplishments ===
- Ranked 10th on Progress Magazine's Best Places to Work Survey for 2007. The Best Places to Work program recognizes companies with 25 employees or more who demonstrate best practices in Atlantic Canada.
- Listed 29th on Progress Magazine's 2008 Fastest Growing Companies list for the 4th consecutive year.
- Listed 204th in Branham Group business technology publication, Backbone Magazine's Top 250 Canadian IT Companies for the years 2005–2007. The 'Branham 300' list is comprised in part of Canadian companies ranked on their gross revenues for 2007 financial reports.
- Awarded project funding of $2,023,773 in January 2007 for GenieKnows Personalized Local Search via the Atlantic Innovation Fund (AIF).

=== Philanthropy ===
GenieKnows has donated resources and money to many organizations including:

- Make-a-Wish Foundation
- IWK Foundation
- World Vision
- Junior Achievement
- Fashion Targets Breast Cancer
