= Ecocho =

Search engine

- Website: www.ecocho.com.au
- Commercial: Yes
- Current status: Defunct

Ecocho was a search engine with the aim of offsetting carbon emissions by donating 70% of revenues to 'carbon offset credits'. The site launched on 14 April 2008 and closed in or before 2012.

It was owned by the Found Agency, a search engine optimisation company.

The Ecocho search was powered by Yahoo! after a termination of their account with Google.

For every 1,000 searches, Ecocho claimed that 1 ton of greenhouse gases are offset through the planting of trees. However, the precise amount was not given, nor were the number of searches performed on the site. Rather, the website maintained a tally of trees planted and of kilograms of CO_{2} offset.

== Google violations ==
On 22 April 2008, Ecocho was informed by Google that they would be denied the use of Google's search technologies for multiple past violations of Google's policies. The issue has been discussed on the Ecocho blog. The mixed reactions from users can be seen in the blog comments, some taking further action by complaining to Google, and others agreeing with Google. The registration of the domain name "ecocho.co.uk" expired on March 10, 2009, and it was activated again for a short period of time with few variations in graphics from June 2009, until it was finally closed between 2011 and 2012.

== See also ==
- Carbon offset
- Global warming
- Ecosia
- Forestle
- List of search engines
