= Yep =

Yep or YEP may refer to:

- A form of yes, an affirmative particle in the English language; see yes and no
- "Yep!", a 1959 Duane Eddy song
- Yorkshire Evening Post, a newspaper in England
- Baojun Yep, an electric car
- Yep, an Internet Search Engine

== People ==
- Laurence Yep (born 1948), Chinese–American writer of children's books
- Yep Kramer (born 1957), Dutch–Frisian speed skater
