= Ryan Merkley =

Ryan Merkley may refer to:

- Ryan Merkley (businessman), Chief Operating Officer of National Public Radio
- Ryan Merkley (ice hockey) (born 2000), Canadian ice hockey player
