= Daybees Search =

Search engine for events

Daybees Search (or Daybees Event Search) is a web-based vertical search engine for events. Daybees was the first application of its type designed specifically for events.

== About ==
When the UK beta website launched in March 2013, Daybees had over 230 event categories with over 1.5 million happenings of all kinds, making it one of the largest event-based search engines on the web. The process for generating event listings is primarily by web scraping, using algorithms with web crawlers, to find any events taking place. Event data is extracted from the crawled event pages and assimilated into a data stack. This is then formatted, tagged, categorized and compiled. A software-based merging tool is utilized to prevent duplication, ensuring that identical events listed on multiple websites are consolidated.. The user-interface provides an accessible way for Daybees users to find events.

== Mobile platforms ==
The Daybees Event Finder mobile app was released for iOS devices on 1 June 2013, followed by support for Android devices on 5 June 2013. The Daybees mobile app was listed as one of the best new apps of July 2013 and in "Apps of the Week" and "Picks of the Week" for August 2013. The app has a feature which enables users to add their own events that can be shared with selected personal connections.

== Draft versions of iconic movie posters ==
Bill Gold, granted Daybees permission to publish their exploratory conceptual development work for movies including The Exorcist, Ocean's Eleven (2001 film), Pulp Fiction, and A Clockwork Orange (film). This collection was released in 2013.
