= Munax =

Swedish search engine company

- Type: Private
- Industry: Internet, Search Engine systems, computer software
- Founded: Stockholm, Sweden (2007)
- Headquarters: Stockholm, Sweden
- Key people: Jan-Olof Granlund, Johan Berg, Thor-Daniel Hjaltason, Asgeir Bjarnason, Claes-Göran Fridh, Kevin Hoffman
- Products: (See article)
- Website: www.munax.com (Offline)

Munax was a Swedish company that developed a Large Hyper-Parallel Execution (LHPE) search engine system Munax XE. Munax XE is an all-content search engine and powered nationwide and worldwide public search engines with page, document, audio, video, images, software, and email search. Other customers included vertical search engines and mobile operators.

For multimedia, Munax also developed a functionality that lets the visitors pre-listen to audio and preview videos, making it easier for the visitor to decide what song or video he/she is looking for before playing it, or visiting the site hosting it. The visitor could also decide to transcode any multimedia file to make it moveable to the mobile phone or any type of multimedia player.

== History ==
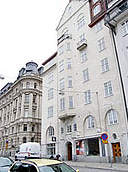
Munax Headquarters

While working as a consultant for larger high tech companies, Jan-Olof Granlund spent his free time working on a specification for a search engine technology. The goal was to (1) develop a number of new algorithms for ranking independent of the type of data and (2) efficient distribution and scaling of processing power and data over a large cluster of servers. The specification was ready in 2004 and the first beta search engine system was implemented in 2005 and a license was sold to a search engine company on Iceland. In 2007, the company Munax AB was founded and Granlund left his consultant business to work full-time in the new company. Munax had shareholders from Sweden, Iceland, the United States, and China. The major investor in Munax was sv:Affärsstrategerna. The technology of the Munax company was later sold and the company was closed down.

== Munax features ==
On the system level, Munax can be installed on a single computer or an arbitrary number of computers on a local area network, or over computers on the internet. The execution is logically distributed over subsystems, not machines. One machine can host several subsystems or one subsystem can span over several machines. This way, Munax can be scaled and distributed freely and each machine's execution power can be utilized to its maximum.

On the indexing level, Munax full-indexes a range of document types, including: htm html shtm shtml jhtm asp php php3 pdf ps doc xls ppt rtf wp wp5 wp6 wpd txt c cpp h. When it comes to link-indexing in Munax, this is more complex than just indexing the anchor text and the URL. Amongst other things, Munax relates each link to the other links on the page and to the text of the page itself. Munax supports the link-indexing of gif, jpg, tga, bmp, iff, img, jif, mac, msp, pcx, pic, tif, ico, jpe, mp3, wav, ram, snd, mp4, aif, mid, vqf, la1, lav, mp2, avi, mpg, mpeg, rm, qt, asx, mov, fli, flc, eps, wri, asc, fmk, for, zip, gzip, tar, arc, lzh, sit, rar, arj, dd, tgz, lha, exe, hqx, dll, vbs, vxd, bat, cmd, class, jar, java, jav and email addresses. Munax knows what type of files these are and groups them accordingly. Munax also allows for structured indexing, i.e. the indexing of XML files and automatically creates each xml tag as an individual search item.

On the search level, several independent ranking algorithms process the inverted index together with hundreds of search parameters to produce the final ranking for each document.

For the visitor, Munax provided a long range of search features, including the search for pages, documents, audio, video, images, compressed files, torrents, software and email addresses, or to get all type of results on the same page (composite search, supersearch). The visitor could also decide which ranking algorithms to be used, search across domains, search within sites, before/after/between dates, demand objects-on-page, pre-view & pre-listen to multimedia files and view objects-on-page and pages with the tags stripped away.

== PlayAudioVideo ==
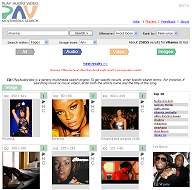
PlayAudioVideo search page

Munax started the construction of the PlayAudioVideo multimedia search engine in July 2007 and opened it for beta testers in December the same year. PlayAudioVideo, beta 1, was opened for the public in February 2008 and beta 2 opened in June 2008.

PlayAudioVideo was the first true search engine for multimedia, i.e., providing search on the web for images, video and audio/music in the same search engine. Through Munax composite search, the visitor gets the results for all multimedia types on the same result page, or he could decide to search for each individual type. Audio and Video could be pre-listened and pre-viewed before connecting to the original multimedia file. This saved time when deciding among versions of the same song or video.

The visitor could start his own web application and make any search result accessible in any type of device. This includes audio for mp3 players and video and audio for mobile phones and/or VCD/DVD.

== Mobile and metasearch ==
Munax acknowledged the demand from the mobile operators to provide their customers with search beyond the traditional text search. Munax provided the users with the search and play of songs and videos regardless of the type of device being used. For metasearch engines, Munax provided any type of search, including traditional text search (pages/documents) and multimedia search, to be presented on their result pages.

== Businesses ==
Munax provided a range of search products to be installed on a corporation's computers, to index their local area network, their website and/or sites on the web. Munax could be tailored individually to suit the needs for each corporation. Munax also provided outsourced search—i.e., any corporation could have their website indexed and searchable from the Munax search engine, but presented as if the search results came from the corporation itself. With or without authentication and encryption. The outsourced search functionality was used in the service All Site Search.

== Name and logo ==
MUNAX, from Munin and Corax.
The scientific name for the raven is Corvus corax, as named in 1758 by Carl Linnaeus, the Swedish biologist who invented the system of classifying organisms by Latin. Munin is one of the two ravens of Odin, the god of wisdom in the Nordic Viking mythology (Viking ages 700–1100 AD). The ravens fly over the earth and remember everything; when the ravens come back, they tell Odin what they have seen—similar to the Munax ravens, or crawlers, which inform the Munax database of what's on the web.
