= Ryan Merkley (businessman) =

Canadian businessman

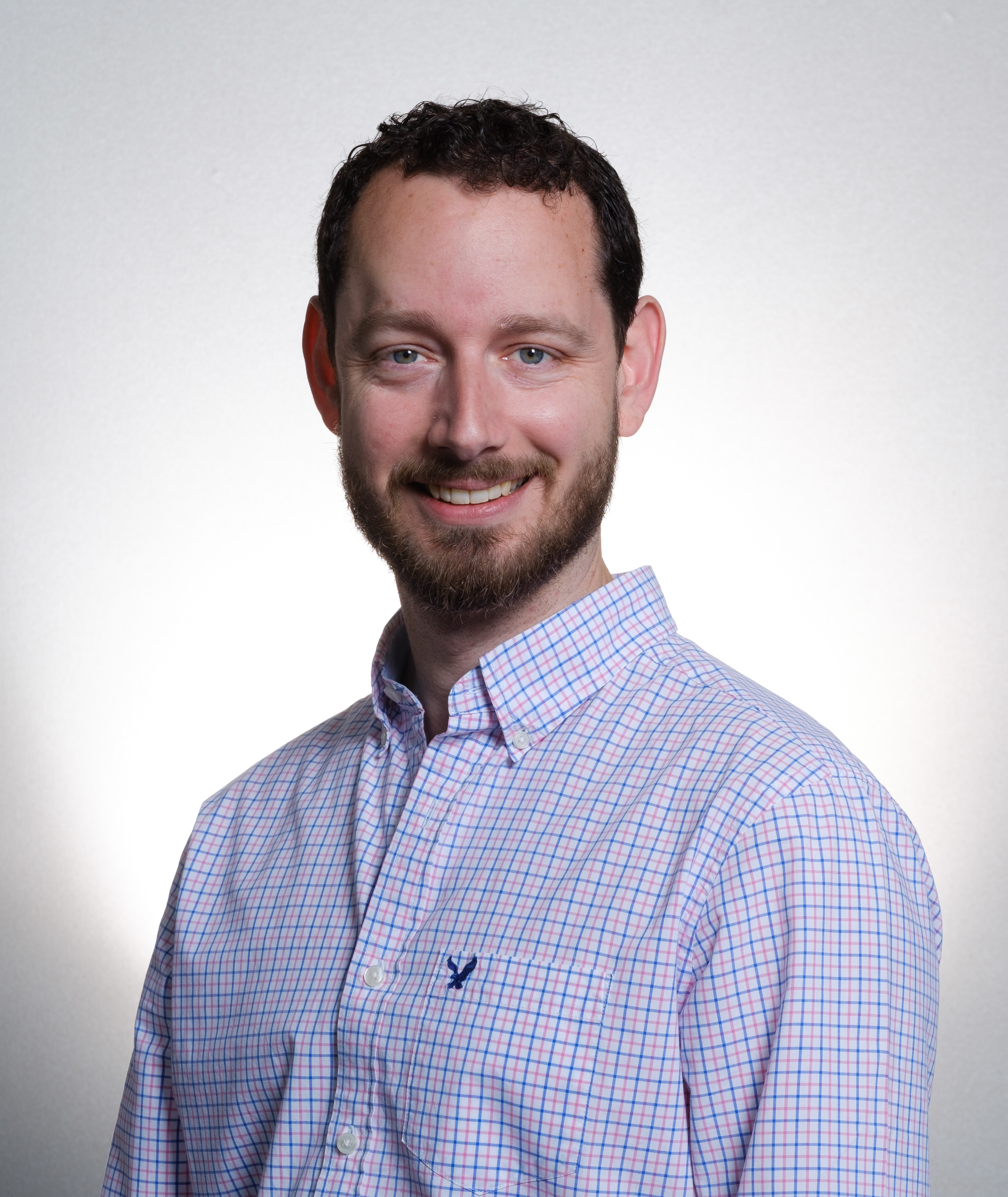
- Born: Cambridge, Canada
- Education: University of Waterloo (BA)
- Merkley introducing himself Recorded August 2019.

Ryan Merkley is a Canadian businessman, and the COO of NPR. Previous to NPR he was Chief of Staff to the office of the executive director of the Wikimedia Foundation, and before that, the CEO of the American non-profit organization Creative Commons. He is an advocate for open licenses, net neutrality and open data initiatives in the public sector. Merkley is the Chair of the Open Worm Foundation board of directors and was trustee at the Quetico Foundation. He writes and speaks on issues such as the sharing economy, academic publishing and legal infrastructure for sharing content.

In 2016, he was listed in the Globe and Mail's "Sixteen Torontonians to Watch in 2016".

== Career ==
Merkley worked for the City of Toronto government and the City of Vancouver government in roles such as Director of Communications and Senior Advisor to the Office of the Mayor. In 2010, he moved to the Mozilla Foundation to take the role of Director of Programs and Strategy. During his tenure at Mozilla, he contributed to the development of products in support of the open web including Lightbeam, Webmaker, and Popcorn.

Merkley joined Creative Commons as CEO in 2014, after the position was vacated by Catherine Casserly in 2013. His 2016 op-ed in Wired criticising the academic publishing industry was referenced by then-Vice President of the United States Joe Biden in his speech to the American Association for Cancer Research, calling for more open research. In 2016, he successfully secured a $10 million grant from The William and Flora Hewlett Foundation to support Creative Commons' new strategy, re-focusing the organisation on encouraging sharing.

On February 7, 2017, Merkley announced a partnership between Creative Commons, Wikimedia Foundation and The Metropolitan Museum of Art where the museum released 375,000 images under a public domain dedication Creative Commons Zero, known as CC0. As part of the announcement, Creative Commons also released the beta of CC Search which included social features for list sharing and simple attribution. In early 2021, the search engine was renamed to Openverse and joined the WordPress project.
