= GlobalSpec =

American technology services company

- Company type: Subsidiary
- Founded: 1996
- Headquarters: Albany, New York
- Founders: John Schneiter, Thomas Brownell, Andrea Schneiter and Mark Gaulin
- Industry: Information technology
- Services: Software and technology services, vertical search
- Revenue: US$10–50 million
- Employees: 201–500
- Parent: Warburg Pincus (1996-2012); IHS (now Accuris) (2012-2016); IEEE (2016-2020); Compare Networks Inc. (since 2020)
- Website: www.globalspec.com

GlobalSpec is a technology services company which provides a search engine of engineering and industrial products, indexing over 180 million parts divided into 2,300,000 product families, from over 24,000 manufacturer and distributor catalogs. GlobalSpec is a domain-specific (or "vertical search") tool, in that its focused domain allows for optimized results. Within product families, searches can be narrowed by selecting values for parameters that are specific to that product type.

The website has over 8 million registered members, and as of 2009, membership was growing at a rate of 20,000 per week. In 2007, the company achieved 35% revenue growth, the sixth year in a row that the company achieved double-digit revenue growth. The website has approximately 1.3 unique million visitors a month with 2.8 million page views and an average of 4.9 minutes time spent. GlobalSpec has partnerships with several well-known companies, including:

- AltaVista
- The International Society of Automation (ISA)
- McGraw-Hill
- Dassault Systèmes

SolidWorks which is a product of Dassault Systèmes has embedded access to GlobalSpec's search engine inside its computer-aided design software.

Warburg Pincus sold GlobalSpec to IHS in 2012 for $135 million.

The Institute of Electrical and Electronics Engineers (IEEE) acquired GlobalSpec from IHS in 2016.

GlobalSpec was acquired from the IEEE by Compare Networks Inc. on July 31, 2020.

In March 2026, GlobalSpec and TREW Marketing, with collaboration from Elektor, released a joint State of Marketing to Engineers report.

== See also ==
- List of search engines
- Vertical search
