= Yongzin =

Tibetan language search engine

- Founded: August 2016; 10 years ago
- Headquarters: Tibet
- Website: www.yongzin.com

Yongzin (Tibetan: ཡོངས་འཛིན, Chinese: 云藏) is the first search engine of Tibetan language in the world. It went live in August 2016, at a cost of 23 million yuan ($3.6 million) from a location in Gonghe County, Hainan Tibetan Autonomous Prefecture, Qinghai Province, China.

"Yongzin" is a Tibetan word. The first meaning is 'teacher'. The second meaning (by dividing the word into two characters) is 'to acquire comprehensively'.

Yongzin is developed by the Tibetan Language Information Technology Research Center of Hainan Tibetan Autonomous Prefecture. This project is started from April 2013, and it belongs to the 'Tibetan language informationization construction' project, which is a part of the 12th five-year plan for the ethnic minorities of Qinghai Province.

According to a testing in 2016, the search engine censored some Tibetan words, including "Free Tibet", "Dalai Lama" and even "Tibetan tea".

Yongzin has eight parts: news, webpage, image, video, audio, encyclopedia, library, and know. Yongzin intends to build the biggest Tibetan digital library in the world, and develop software for Tibetan-language users.

In August 2020, Yongzin released a upgraded search engine app, which adopted an AI-based Tibetan word segmentation system. Yongzin also released an input method software supporting Tibetan, Chinese and English.

== See also ==
- Comparison of web search engines
- List of search engines
- Timeline of web search engines
