= Enterprise information access =

Enterprise information access refers to information systems that allow for enterprise search; content classification; content clustering; information extraction; enterprise bookmarking; taxonomy creation and management; information presentation (for example, visualization) to support analysis and understanding; and desktop or personal knowledge search.

== See also ==
- Enterprise content management
- Intranet
