= Leit.is =

Icelandic search engine

- The homepage of Leit.is.
- Website type: Search engine
- Available in: Icelandic; English
- Owner: Leit.is ehf
- Website: www.leit.is www.search.is
- Commercial: yes
- Registration: no
- Launched: June 16, 1999
- Current status: Inactive as of 2025

Leit.is was Icelandic internet search engine developed by the corporation DCG ehf. It was available both in an Icelandic and an English version and was launched on 16 June 1999. It was originally developed by Nova Media–Nýmiðlun ehf. and based on Infoseek, but later DCG ehf. hosted and developed the search engine. After its launch, it was one of the most visited websites in Iceland.

== Functionality ==
Leit.is's search engine could search for a term on a specific website and for titles of websites. It can also find websites which link to a given site, as well as search for subdomains of websites.

== See also ==
- List of search engines
- Internet in Iceland
