= RecipeBridge =

- Website type: Recipe Search Engine
- Owner: Gourmet Ads
- Creators: Andy Theimer, Bill Brennan
- Website: www.recipebridge.com
- Commercial: Yes
- Registration: Optional
- Launched: September 2008; 18 years ago
- Current status: Dead

RecipeBridge is a vertical search engine for recipes, founded by Milwaukee-based entrepreneurs Andy Theimer and Bill Brennan. It was established in December 2007 and a beta version was launched in 2008 which makes it the oldest recipe-dedicated search engine on the web.

The full version was launched in April, 2009. As of July 2011, it searches through 350 different recipe sites and blogs with over 1.7 million recipes.

RecipeBridge allows users to search and filter results by keyword, cuisine ingredient, meal, or occasion. The results page provides the brief description of the recipes and a number of ingredients needed. The search results can be narrowed down by adding other ingredients.

In July 2011 RecipeBridge has been acquired by the global food advertising network Gourmet Ads with a goal "to build the largest recipe search engine, combining recipe sites, blogs, food brands and supermarkets into one destination".

Since 10 March 2026, the website shows only a Hello, world WordPress post.
