= DocFetcher =

Open-source desktop search application

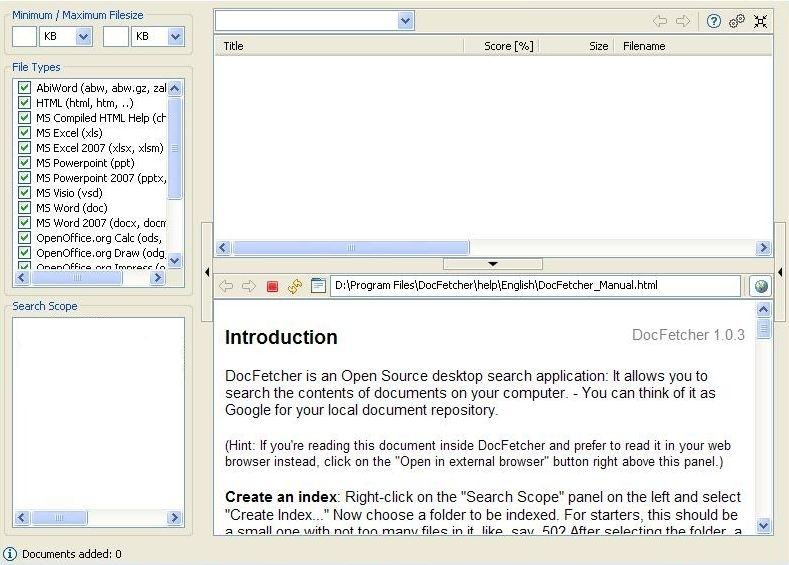
- Developer: DocFetcher project
- Initial release: June 5, 2007; 18 years ago
- Stable release: 1.1.27 / January 19, 2026; 3 months ago
- Written in: Java
- Operating system: Microsoft Windows, Mac OS X, Linux
- License: Eclipse Public License
- Website: https://sourceforge.net/projects/docfetcher/

DocFetcher is a free and open source desktop search application. It runs on Windows, Mac OS X and Linux and is written in Java. The application has a graphical user interface, which is written using the Standard Widget Toolkits.

The program is an indexing search tool, meaning it has a local database of file content that it checks, rather than looking over all files on your machine. This means the program must always be running to monitor changes, but search results are instant. Search tools are based on Apache Lucene software, a widely used, open source search engine.

== Features ==
- Unicode support
- Full text search for all major document file formats, including:
  - Office files (Microsoft Office, OpenDocument, Outlook (PST), ...)
  - EPUB, PDF
  - RTF, SVG and any other plain text files
  - Audio metadata (MP3, FLAC)
  - Picture metadata (JPEG)
  - Archive formats (ZIP, 7z, RAR, Tar). Also supports nested archive files
  - HTML with pair detection. Which means that DocFetcher detects when an HTML file and a folder containing the resource files (Images, Scripts, ...) of the page belong together. (These resource files are usually downloaded when saving a website)
- Possibility to automatically detect file changes and update the index accordingly
- Exclusion of files from indexing based on regular expressions
- A query language supporting boolean operators (OR, AND, NOT), wildcards, phrase search, fuzzy search and proximity search
- World languages: translations in Chinese, Italian, Ukrainian. Partly translated to French, Japanese, Spanish, and German.

Note that a commercial version of the program DocFetcher Pro is in development with additional features.

== See also ==
- List of desktop search engines
