= Ms. Dewey =

Discontinued web search engine by Microsoft

- The Ms. Dewey interface
- Website type: Search engine
- Owner: Microsoft
- Creators: McCann-Erickson San Francisco, Sausage Films and EVB
- Website: www.msdewey.com
- Commercial: No
- Registration: No
- Current status: Inactive

Ms. Dewey was a web search engine by Microsoft, first unveiled in October 2006. Ms. Dewey was an Adobe Flash–based experimental interface for Live Search, where the eponymous Ms. Dewey, played by actress Janina Gavankar, acted as an interactive search assistant for the user's inquiries. Ms. Dewey would audibly comment on searched keywords, and she would also perform a variety of random actions when idle, including taking props out from behind her desk. Furthermore, a cityscape featured behind Ms. Dewey would change depending on the time of day.

Ms. Dewey was developed by advertising agency McCann-Erickson and digital content marketing firm EVB San Francisco. Gavankar's responses, consisting of 600 different video clips, were recorded over the course of three days.

Ms. Dewey became inactive in January 2009.

== See also ==
- Tafiti
- Office Assistant
- The Subservient Chicken
- Microsoft Bob
