= Searchdaimon =

Search engine

Searchdaimon ES
- Developer: Searchdaimon As
- Release: 2006
- Written in: C, Perl
- Type: Search engine
- License: GPL v2 license
- Website: www.searchdaimon.com

Searchdaimon ES (Enterprise Search) is an open source enterprise search engine for full text search of structured and unstructured data available under the GPL v2 license. Its major features include hit highlighting, faceted search, dynamic clustering, database integration, rich document (e.g., Word, PDF) handling and full document level security.

First developed by Norwegian software company Searchdaimon As as a commercial solution, the company shifted to an open source development model in 2013, with the company offering commercial support and other services. The company has its headquarters in Oslo and a research department in Trondheim.

== Enterprise search technology ==
The technology has primarily been used for searching companies' internal data sources, but has also been used in an internet search engine.

Searchdaimon ES can be delivered both as software, as a virtual or physical server and as a cloud computing service at Amazon Web Services.

Features:

- Crawl http, databases, Windows file shares, Exchange, SharePoint and local files
- Extract data from many common document formats like Microsoft Word, Excel, RTF, PowerPoint and Adobe Acrobat PDF
- Creates thumbnails for many common image formats like PNG, JPEG and TIF
- Support full document level security and integration with Active Directory
- HTML administration interface

== History ==
The two founders (Runar Buvik and Magnus Galåen) started to develop a search engine in 1998 while they were studying computer science at the Norwegian University of Science and Technology. The first version became publicly available in 2003.

In 2005, Searchdaimon As was founded as a company to commercialize the technology. Early investors were Springfondet (a joint venture by Kistefos and Oslo Innovation Center) and ICT Group AS.

Searchdaimon ES, the company's product for enterprise search, was released in 2006.

In 2008, the company signed its first contract to delivering internet search technology to a third party.

In 2011, the company licensed a free version of Searchdaimon ES.

On 8 July 2013, Searchdaimon was released as open source under the GPL v2 license. At some point after this, development on the product appears to have stopped. The last real commit was in 2015 with a minor update in 2017 to install on CentOS 6.5. While that may have worked at one time to install using a KickStart configuration, the source repose have since been pulled down and the script will not work. The main website has old virtual machines that still run on Fedora 8 and do not support https for the admin or search interfaces. And lastly, their forums have become overrun with spam bots. While the main website still has price lists for commercial support, the projects as a whole seems to be abandoned.
