= FindSounds =

Online sound library

FindSounds is a website run by the Comparisonics Corporation. It searches an index of over 1,000,000 sounds on the internet, with 100,000 users and 1,000,000 searches each month. The index mainly consists of sound effects and musical instrument samples. Results are in AIFF, AU and WAV formats, in both mono and stereo.

The site offers the FindSounds Palette, a program which also searches the FindSounds index.

The website has been shown on television: TechTV; in newspapers: The New York Times; in magazines: Electronic Musician, Mix, Online, PC World, Popular Science Video Systems, Yahoo! Internet Life; and on countless websites, such as Yahoo's Pick of the Day, and USAToday.com.

The New York Times wrote:

Although professional sound and video producers often use this site, it's a hoot for any visitor with an audio player. You can search for a sound by typing in a phrase like "footsteps on gravel" or browse the Sound Types section for several hundred categorized examples ("burp" yielded 143 sonic belches).

== See also ==
- List of search engines
