= LeapFish =

LeapFish.com
- Website type: Metasearch engine
- Available in: English
- Owner: Dotnext Inc.
- Website: www.leapfish.com
- Launched: November 3, 2008
- Current status: Not active

LeapFish.com was a search aggregator that retrieved results from other portals and search engines, including Google, Bing and Yahoo!, and also search engines of blogs, videos etc. It was a registered trademark of Dotnext Inc, launched on 3 November 2008.

== Mission and product concept ==
The Dotnext Inc incarnation of Leapfish based in Pleasanton focused on selling advertising via a telemarketing team consisting of 80 salespersons that leveraged what it called a single experience for both searching and sharing traditional and real-time content.

== History ==
The LeapFish.com domain was originally home to a domain name appraisal service created by Jeremy Harris in 2006; this was purchased in 2008 and rebranded as a Meta Search Engine.

Leapfish launched in November 2008 and incorporated the top three search engines (Google, Yahoo!, Live Search) as well as other tools like YouTube, Amazon, and Yahoo! Answers.

Leapfish launched its last version in November 2009. The update included features such as traditional and real-time search, a customizable homepage, interactive widgets, and social media integration.

As of February 12, 2012, the leapfish.com domain has been for sale.

== Features ==
- Real-time search
- Meta-search – LeapFish retrieved its search results from other portals and combined them on one page. Results from Google, Yahoo, and Bing were displayed on the page as well as images, video, news, Yahoo! answers, shopping, publications and blogs.
- Customizable home page – LeapFish offered a customizable homepage to its users, similar to iGoogle.
- Share Bar – Outgoing links from LeapFish search results would display a "share bar" at the bottom of the page that allowed users to link the page to social sharing sites.
- Profile pages – LeapFish gave users space to display social information such as Tweets, YouTube Videos, Blog Posts and Flickr images.
- Widgets - Provided non-webpage results (such as multimedia or news articles) in form of widgets.
- LeapFish offered affiliate applications for website owners.

== Advertising ==
The main LeapFish advertising programs allowed business owners to display a permanent advertisement on the top of the search results page. The ad space was granted by purchasing a keyword of the advertiser's choice. The space was sold via aggressive telemarketing with the promise that the space could be sold on at a potentially increased price at a later date.

== Domain appraisal ==
Prior to its purchase by Dotnext Inc, LeapFish was home to a domain name appraisal service. In addition to its search tools, the new LeapFish provided domain appraisals complemented with a scoring system. In addition to appraisal values, LeapFish provided domain information such as Traffic Rankings and Unique Visitors from Compete.com.

== Controversy ==
The Dotnext Inc incarnation of leapfish.com had a mixed reception from users of sitepoint forums, from bloggers and other regular web users.

On February 3, 2009, the online blog TechCrunch posted evidence of LeapFish sales representatives intentionally abusing Google's pay-per-click model against potential customers. Ben Behrouzi, the CEO of LeapFish's parent company, DotNext, confirmed the sales representative's actions, but announced that the representative was no longer employed by the company.

The company has also been accused of astroturfing and spamming.

As opposed to other search engines, such as Google or Yahoo which appear to favour web-based sales, Leapfish keywords are largely sold via an aggressive telemarketing operation which has not been without friction with the online community. The telemarketing team consists of 80 sales persons.

== Ratings and reviews ==
The Better Business Bureau rated LeapFish "F" (its lowest possible rating) after receiving 20 separate complaints (some of which remain unresolved). The Better Business Bureau recorded eight separate complaints about sales practices.

== See also ==
- Search aggregator
- Metasearch engine
- MetaCrawler
- WebCrawler
- List of search engines
