= Viewzi =

Defunct American internet search engine company

- Type: Privately held
- Industry: internet
- Founded: Dallas, U.S. (2006)
- Defunct: December 28, 2010
- Headquarters: Dallas, Texas, U.S.
- Products: Visual search engine

Viewzi was a search engine company based in Dallas, Texas that developed a highly visual experience that tailored the way users look at information based on what they are looking for. Users got over 16 "views" for their search including MP3 view (with a list of streaming audio you can play), album view (cover art and related musicians), plus specialized lenses for images, news, and more.

A project that was said to have been in the works for roughly two years, Viewzi, a visual search utility, reached beta stage in April, 2008. Instead of providing a single list of results in a set form for search requests, as Google does, Viewzi provided different “views” that are tailored to the request being made.

Viewzi raised over $2M in seed funding. As of December 28, 2010, Viewzi's website announced that the search engine had not been under development since 2008, and had been closed down.
