= StuRents.com =

Property company of the United Kingdom

StuRents
- Available in: English
- Industry: Internet & Real Estate
- Website: sturents.com
- Commercial: Yes
- Registration: Optional
- Launched: 2008
- Current status: Active

StuRents.com is a dedicated student property search engine and tenancy management platform, operating across the UK. Launched in 2009, the site provides a place for advertising student accommodation to students.

== History ==
StuRents was founded in 2008 and incorporated in 2009 by undergraduates studying at Durham University. The site currently lists 200,000 student bedspaces.

== Recognition ==
In 2008, the company won the 2008 Digital Awards 'Best B2C' and in 2009, StuRents.com was awarded the Blueprint Business Prize

StuRents.com was recently cited alongside Rightmove as a core accommodation website dedicated to helping students find the right accommodation for university.
