= Speechbot =

SpeechBot was a web search engine for streaming media content developed at Compaq's (later HP) research laboratories in Cambridge, MA and Australia. Compaq launched the website at Streaming Media West 1999 in San Jose, CA. The internet radio shows indexed by SpeechBot included The Motley Fool, Fresh Air, Talk of the Nation, The Dr. Laura Program, and Dreamland with Art Bell. By June 2003, the service had indexed over 17,000 hours of multimedia content. The website was taken offline in 2005, after HP closed their Cambridge research lab.

The SpeechBot indexing workflow involved a farm of Windows workstations that retrieved the streaming content; and a Linux cluster running speech recognition to transcribe the spoken audio. The web server, search index and metadata library were hosted on AlphaServers running Tru64 UNIX.

If transcripts were already available, then these were aligned to the audio stream; otherwise, an approximate transcript was produced using speech recognition. The Calista recognizer that was used was derived from Sphinx-3. Due to the low quality of streaming audio at the time, the word error rate was quite high, but most searches were still able to retrieve relevant hits. The search results linked to the offset in the stream that corresponded to the search phrase, so that users did not need to listen to the entire program to find the section of interest.
