= Tafiti =

Discontinued animated search engine launched by Microsoft

Tafiti displaying the news results for a search of the term "Tafiti"

Tafiti was an animated search engine launched by Microsoft to showcase the Silverlight animation and video player.

It was launched in 2007 and was discontinued in 2008.

== Overview ==
The name Tafiti comes from the Swahili word meaning to "do research". The Tafiti search engine was a project driven by the Platform Incubation team in Microsoft as an effort to promote next generation search concepts and technologies such as Silverlight and the Live Search API.

The engine was able bring results from Web, RSS feeds, images, news, and books.

Tafiti incorporated visuals with common web searches. Searches were presented, through a graphic interface, with results appearing in a central column. Via a carousel on the left hand side, users could select the type of media to search in Websites, news feeds, books, or images. Results could be dragged and saved on a "shelf" on the right hand side. These results could then be e-mailed or added to a blog. Tafiti also offered a "tree view," with search results displayed as branches.

Microsoft explained the purpose of the service with: "Help people use the web for research projects that span multiple search queries and sessions by helping visualize, store, and share research results." The service was intended to "explore the intersection of richer experiences on the web and the increasing specialization of search."

Tafiti was discontinued in 2009 with the release of Microsoft Bing. Source code was released in July 2008 on CodePlex as part of the Windows Live Quick Apps project.

== See also ==
- Comparison of web search engines
- List of search engines
- Timeline of web search engines
