= Everything (software) =

File search utility for Windows

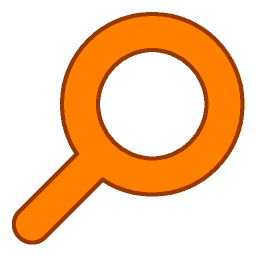

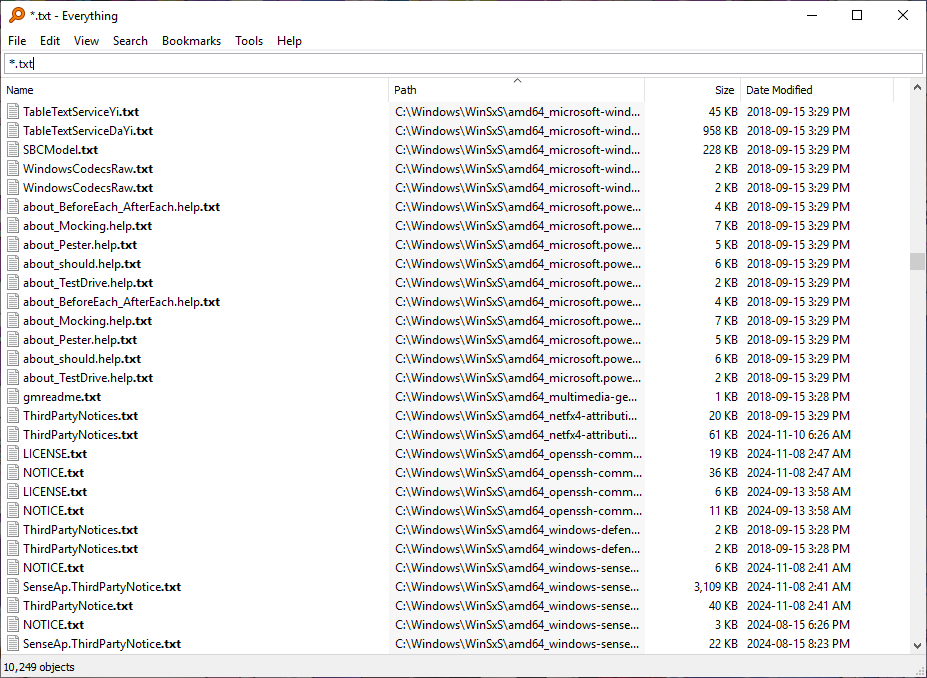
- Everything running on Windows 10
- Developer: David Carpenter
- Release: 22 December 2004; 21 years ago
- Stable release: 1.4.1.1032 / 23 January 2026; 7 months ago
- Preview release: 1.5.0.1423b / 27 August 2026; 7 days ago
- Operating system: Windows NT 4.0, 2000, XP, Vista, 7, 8, 10, 11
- Type: Desktop search
- License: MIT License
- Website: www.voidtools.com

Everything is a freeware desktop search utility for Windows that can rapidly find files and folders by name. While the binaries are licensed under a permissive licence identical to the MIT License, it is not open-source.

== Overview ==
When Everything first runs, it creates an index of the names of every file and folder on all NTFS and ReFS volumes on the system from file metadata, in the case of NTFS from the NTFS Master File Table. By default, all mounted NTFS and ReFS volumes are indexed. Once created, the index is continually updated by the application; in the case of NTFS the updates are fetched from the NTFS change journal.

Specific folders on any file system can also be added to the index, but the indexing of folders not using NTFS or ReFS will be slow, although searching using the completed index will not be.

Regardless of the file system used on the indexed drives and folders, Everything searches its index for filenames matching a user search expression, which may be a fragment of the target filename or a regular expression, displaying intermediate and immediate results as the search term is entered.

Since Everything does not index content and, for NTFS drives, relies only on the NTFS change journal to filter file updates, the only file system activity it requires on NTFS drives is updating its index, and it uses very little memory and processor time to provide its service when only indexing NTFS and ReFS drives.

Take Command Console incorporates the internal command everything to allow command line access to the program.

== Security concerns ==
Because Everything requires access to the NTFS change journal, it must run with administrator privileges, either in a privileged user account or as a Windows service. As a Windows service it can expose search functionality to accounts without administrator privileges. However, Everything does not filter search results by client privileges before displaying them, so that every user can see every filename on a volume.

== Development status ==
No updates of Everything were issued from November 2009 to January 2013. Since then the program has received many updates.

== Similar alternatives ==
Other notable search engines that use the same technique of Everything of directly accessing the NTFS (file system) index to expedite search queries:

- NTFS-Search (last updated 5 July 2017) and SwiftSearch (last updated 6 July 2019) – both open source
- UltraSearch by Jam Software (functionally limited free version of commercial software) – freeware

== See also ==
- List of search engines § Desktop search engines
