= Trexy =

- Founded: 2006
- Dissolved: 2012
- Headquarters: London
- Founders: Nigel Hamilton and Megan Hamilton
- Website: www.trexy.com
- Current status: Defunct

Trexy was a London-based Internet metasearch engine established in early 2006. The website was founded by Nigel Hamilton and Megan Hamilton. It allowed users to record and share "search trails" of their activity on search engines. The trails themselves were searchable, allowing users to save time when searching by examining the pages found by other users. A design goal was also to allow easier searching of the "deep web". The service ceased functioning in early 2012.

The site was used by installing a toolbar in the user's web browser which recorded the user's activity on search sites that Trexy was aware of, which in mid-2006 numbered in excess of 3,000 search engines.

The technology was inspired by Vannevar Bush's 1945 paper As We May Think, in which he described his idea of a machine called a Memex: a Memex would augment one's memory and searching powers by helping to create and share "trails of association" between things in the "common record". The name "Trexy" was derived from trails and memex.

== Awards ==
In July 2006 the British Computer Society announced Trexy as one of the medallists in the Services section of their IT Professional Awards.
