= IdeaList =

- Final release: 5.5 / 2007
- Written in: C
- Operating system: MS-DOS, Windows, Mac
- Available in: British English, French, German
- Type: Personal information manager
- License: Proprietary

IdeaList was a commercially marketed free form text database application originally published by Blackwell Software, a division of Blackwell Science. The incomplete software source for version 4.0 was sold in the late 1990s to Bekon Marketing who continued to develop the product up to version 5.5 before trading ceased. IdeaList originated as an MS-DOS program; versions for Windows and Mac were later released.

The application allows complete textual documents to be entered into a database, then searched and retrieved. It includes script programming to carry out tasks such as printing to labels, envelopes, or letters. It can also publish standalone, search-only databases.
