= YaCy =

Peer-to-peer search engine

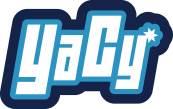

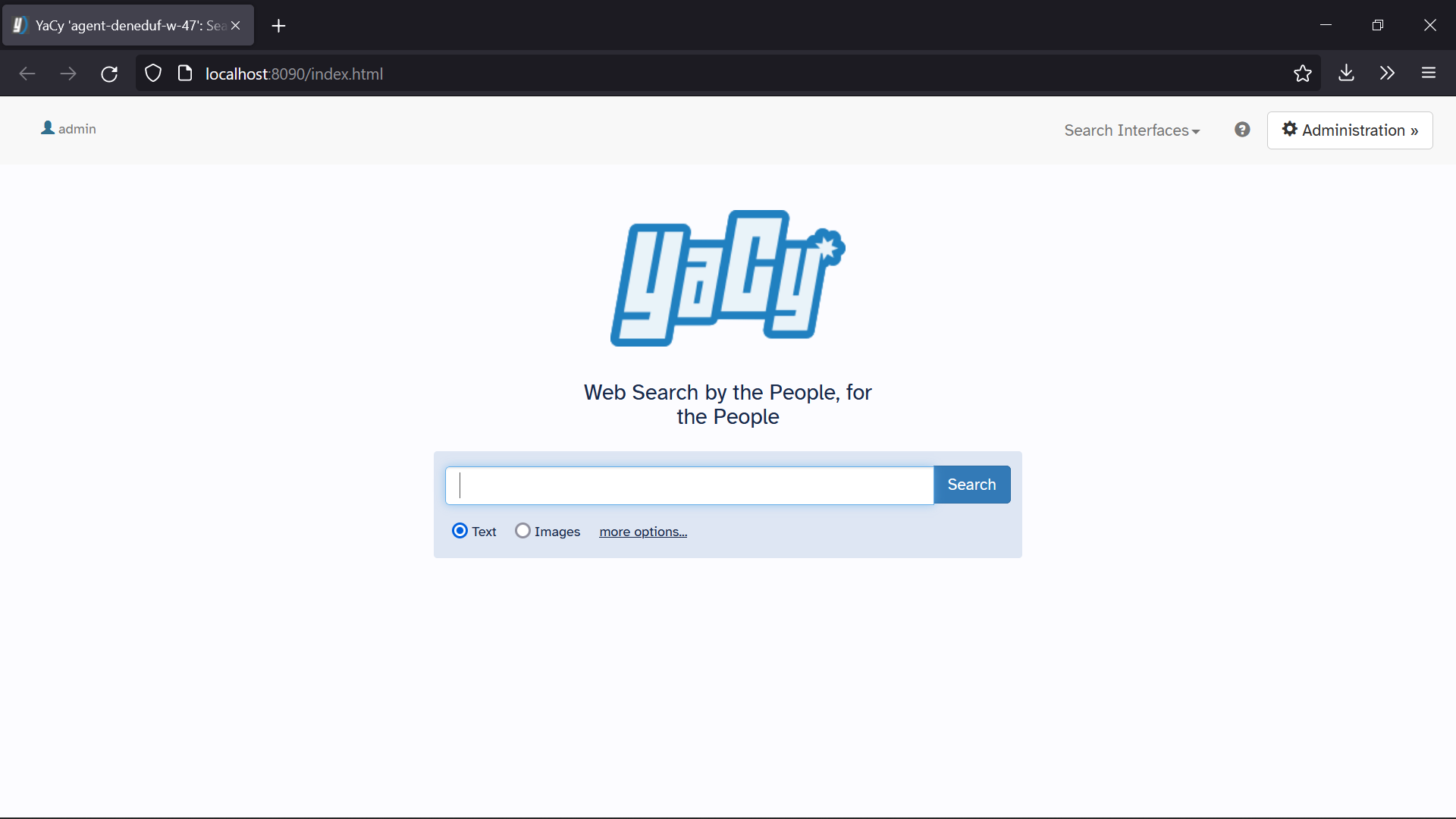
- Original author: Michael Christen
- Developer: YaCy community
- Release: 2003; 23 years ago
- Stable release: 1.940_202412022212 / 2 December 2024; 23 months ago
- Written in: Java
- Operating system: Cross-platform
- Size: 104-113 MB
- Type: Overlay network, Search engine
- License: GPL-2.0-or-later
- Website: yacy.net
- Repository: github.com/yacy/yacy_search_server

YaCy (pronounced “ya see”) is a free distributed search engine built on the principles of peer-to-peer (P2P) networks, created by Michael Christen in 2003. The engine is written in Java and distributed on several hundred "YaCy-peer" computers, as of September 2006.

Each YaCy-peer independently crawls through the Internet, analyzes and indexes found web pages, and stores indexing results in a common database which is shared with other YaCy-peers using principles of peer-to-peer. This decentralized approach ensures privacy and eliminates the need for a central server.

Compared to semi-distributed search engines, the YaCy network has a distributed architecture. All YaCy-peers are equal and no central server exists. It can be run either in a crawling mode or as a local proxy server, indexing web pages visited by the person running YaCy on their computer. Several mechanisms are provided to protect the user's privacy. Search functions are accessed by a locally run web server which provides a search box to enter search terms, and returns search results in a format similar to popular search engines.

== System components ==
YaCy search engine is based on four elements:

Crawler
A search robot that traverses between web pages, analyzing their content.: The crawler is responsible for fetching web pages from the internet. Each peer in the YaCy network can crawl and index websites. The crawling process involves:
- Discovery: Finding new web pages to index by following links.
- Fetching: Downloading the content of web pages.
- Parsing: Extracting relevant information such as text, metadata, and links from the downloaded pages.
Indexer
It creates a reverse word index (RWI), i.e., each word from the RWI has its list of relevant URLs and ranking information. Words are saved as word hashes.
Search and administration interface
Made as a web interface provided by a local HTTP servlet with a servlet engine.
Data storage
Used to store the reverse word index database utilizing a distributed hash table.

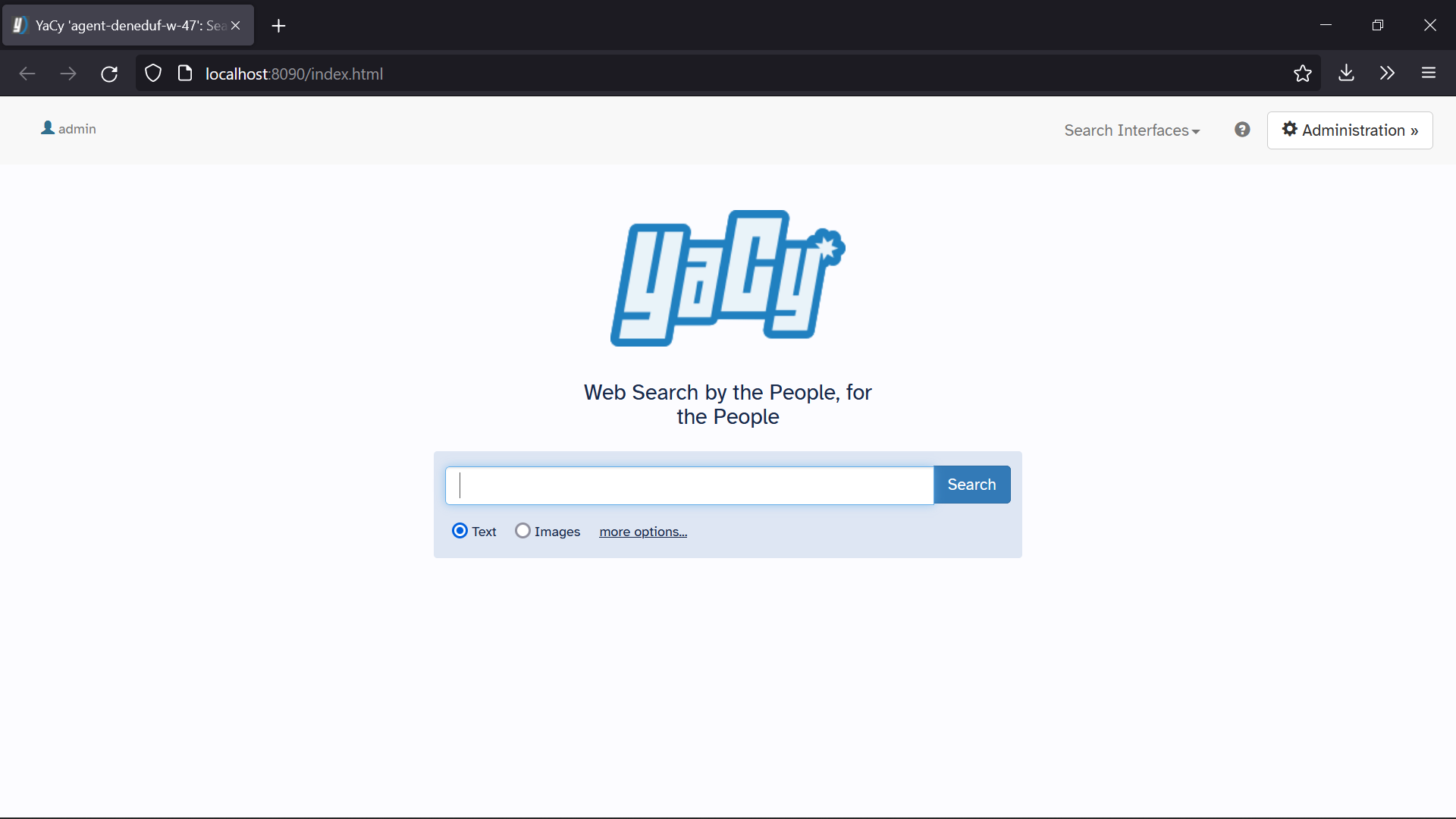
Homepage of YaCy

== Search-engine technology ==
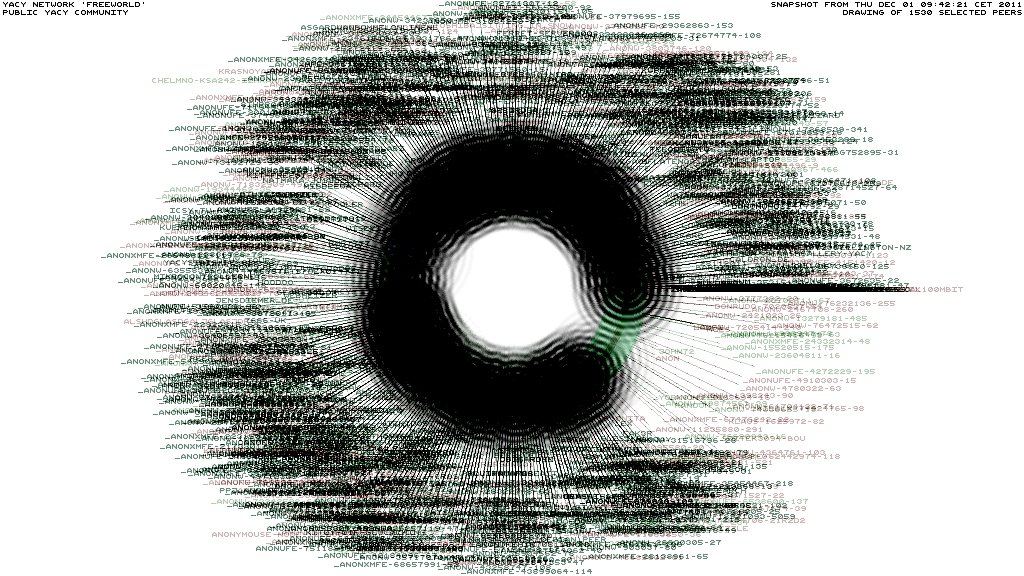
YaCy network

- YaCy is a complete search appliance with user interface, index, administration, and monitoring.
- YaCy harvests web pages with a web crawler. Documents are then parsed, and indexed and the search index is stored locally. If your peer is part of a peer network, then your local search index is also merged into the shared index for that network.
  - A search is started, then the local index contributes with a global search index from peers in the YaCy search network.
- The YaCy Grid is a second-generation implementation of the YaCy peer-to-peer search. A YaCy Grid installation comprises microservices that communicate using the Master Connect Program (MCP).
- The YaCy Parser is a microservice that can be deployed using Docker. When the Parser Component is started, it searches for and connects to an MCP. By default, the local host is searched for an MCP, but you can configure one yourself.

== YaCy platform architecture ==
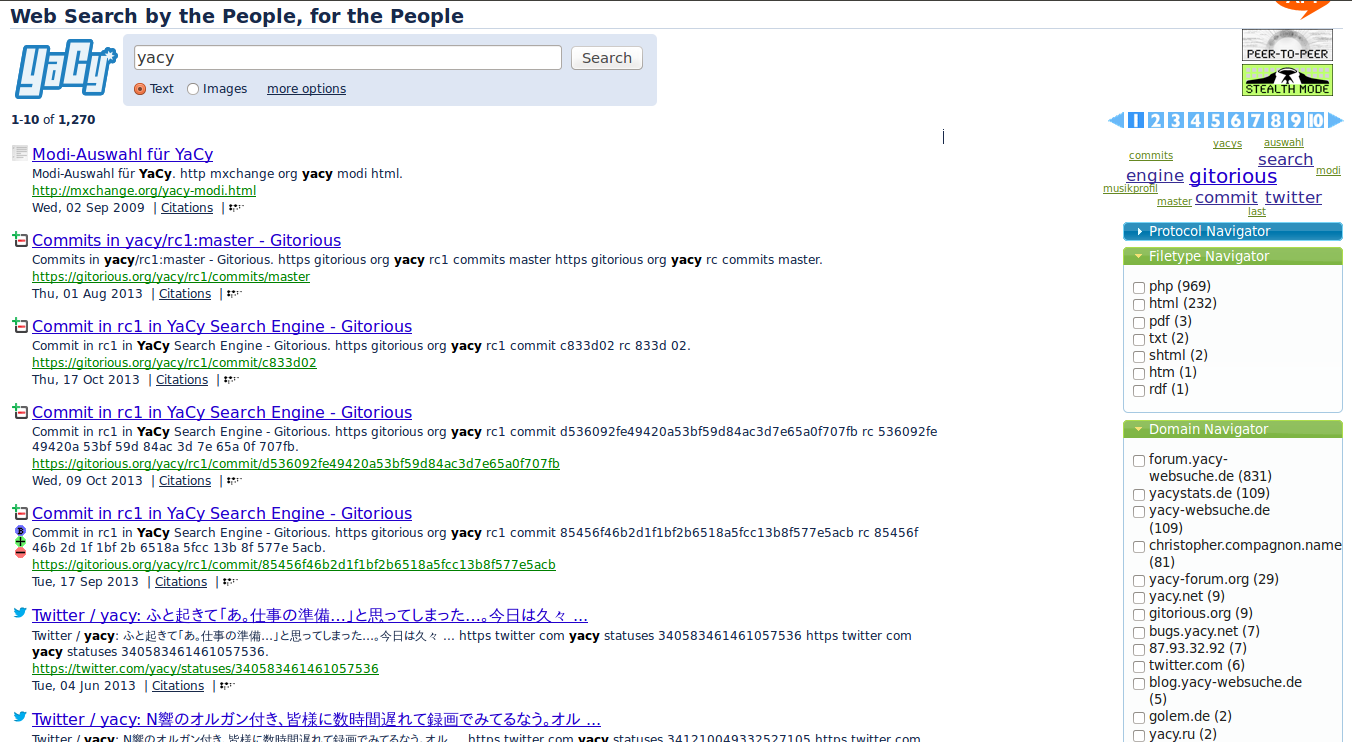
Web search showing results of the different components YaCy uses

YaCy uses a combination of techniques for the networking, administration, and maintenance of indexing the search engine, including blacklisting, moderation, and communication with the community. Here is how YaCy performs these operations:

- Community components
  1. Web forum
  2. Statistics
  3. XML API
- Maintenance
  1. Web Server
  2. Indexing
  3. Crawler with Balancer
  4. Peer-to-Peer Server Communication
- Content organization
  1. Blacklisting and Filtering
  2. Search interface
  3. Bookmarks
  4. Monitoring search results

== Distribution ==
YaCy is available in packages for Linux, Windows, and Macintosh, and also as a Docker image; it can also be installed on other operating systems either by manually building it, or using a tarball. YaCy requires Java 11, Temurin 11 is recommended.

The Debian package can be installed from a repository available at the subdomain of the project's website, but is not yet maintained in the official Debian package repository.

== See also ==
- Dooble – an open-source web browser with an integrated YaCy Search Engine Tool Widget
- List of search engines
- Comparison of search engines
- Seeks
