= Locate32 =

File search utility for Windows

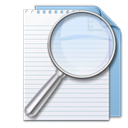

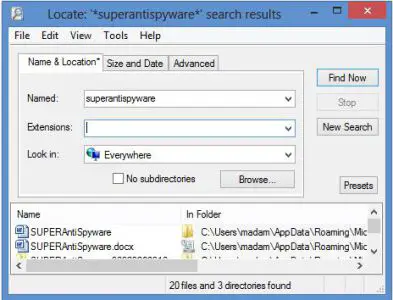
- Locate32 on Windows 8.1
- Developer(s): Janne Huttunen
- Initial release: 1997; 28 years ago
- Stable release: 3.1.11.7100 / July 11, 2011; 14 years ago
- Operating system: Microsoft Windows
- Type: Desktop search
- License: Freeware BSD
- Website: locate32.cogit.net

Locate32 is a file finder for Microsoft Windows (98/NT 4.0 and later). It works by indexing the files on the user's hard drives, thus making searches faster. Removable or remote drives can also be indexed.

Installation is not required. One unpacks the program files anywhere on the hard disk and runs the executable directly. The user first needs to index their files by creating the database. Once indexed, the file names can be searched rapidly and reliably, although it can't search the insides of files.

Locate32 was designed to mimic the locate command on Unix. It was written by Janne Huttunen who indicated in September 2011 that it will no longer be actively maintained. The last version was 3.1 RC3m build 11.7100. As of August 2012 the project moved to the open source repository SourceForge.
