= TickX =

== TickX ==
TickX
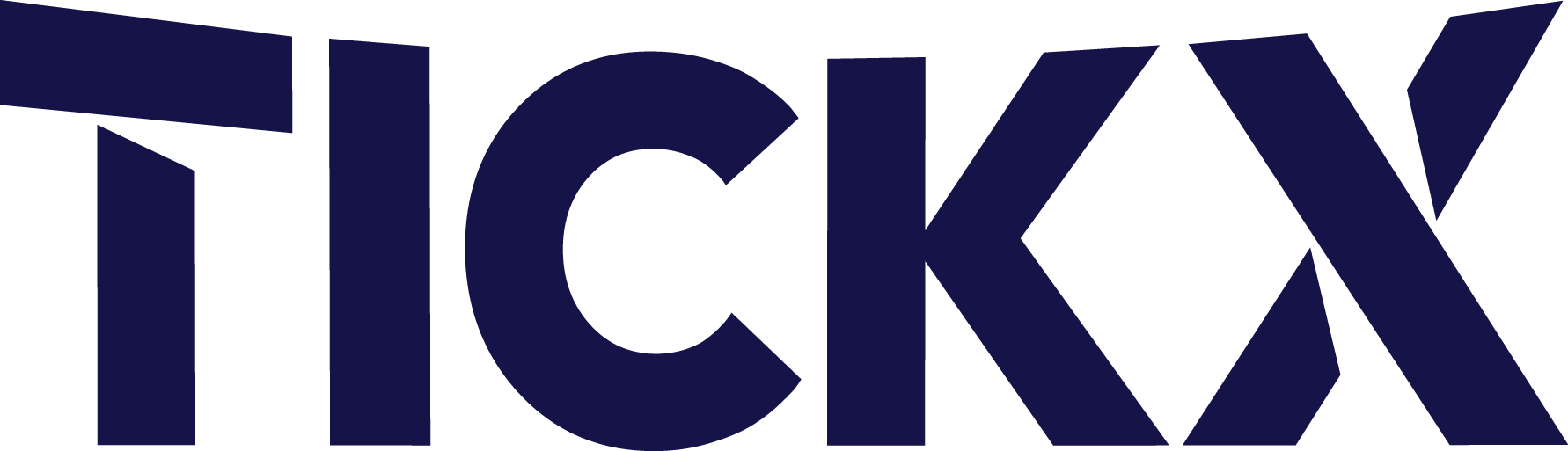
- Industry: Events
- Founded: September 2015
- Founders: Sam Coley and Steve Pearce
- Headquarters: Manchester, United Kingdom
- Website: tickx.com

TickX is a software-as-a-service (SaaS) company founded in Manchester, England, that provides marketing and revenue technology solutions for organizations in the live events and experiences sector. Its tools are designed to integrate with existing ticketing and marketing systems and help companies sell tickets directly through their own websites.

== History ==
TickX was founded in 2015 by Steve Pearce and Sam Coley. Steve Pearce, a University of Manchester graduate, originally envisioned a single platform for event discovery and ticket comparison. He partnered with Sam Coley, a software developer and family friend, to build what was described as a "Skyscanner for events".

The company launched as a consumer-facing ticket search engine, allowing users to compare events and ticket prices across multiple providers. It initially operated in the United Kingdom and later expanded to Ireland, Spain, and the Netherlands. Early backers included Ministry of Sound, and the founders were featured in Virgin's “Four Young Entrepreneurs to Watch” in 2016.

In July 2017, TickX introduced an event discovery chatbot on Facebook Messenger. In 2018, it launched Producer360, a toolkit providing analytics and customer journey insights for event organizers.

In 2019, Pearce and Coley were included in Forbes’ 30 Under 30 Europe list in the Retail and E-commerce category, recognizing TickX's impact on the ticketing and live entertainment industries. That year, the company reported serving over one million customers and raising approximately £4 million in funding.

Following initial interest from production companies and rising demand for tools to enhance direct sales performance, TickX began exploring a business-to-business (B2B) model. The global pandemic in 2020 accelerated this transition, leading the company to focus on developing software that helps experience organisers improve marketing and booking experiences, increasing direct revenue.

A 2025 article in Blooloop notes the company's strategic shift toward becoming a marketing and revenue technology provider for the experience economy. During this period, TickX introduced a suite of products, including Flows, a branded checkout interface; IQ, an actionable analytics and marketing toolkit; PostRev, for post-purchase upgrades and modifications; and Pricing Genius, a rules-based pricing automation system.

By 2025, TickX was serving clients across Europe and North America, including organizations in live entertainment, visitor attractions, and immersive experiences.

== Products ==
Flows – An embeddable, branded checkout interface for direct ticket purchases.

IQ – A full-funnel analytics and marketing toolkit that connects ticketing data to CRM and ad platforms. Features include real-time attribution, audience segmentation, cart abandonment, CAPI and server-side conversion tracking, and automated campaign triggers.

PostRev – A post-purchase feature that allows customers to upgrade or modify their orders after checkout.

Pricing Genius – A rules-based pricing automation tool that adjusts ticket prices in real time based on demand and other configurable criteria.

== Founders ==
Steve Pearce, co-founder and chief executive officer, studied at the University of Manchester prior to founding TickX.

Sam Coley, co-founder and Chief Technology and Product Officer, has a background in software development and leads product engineering at the company.
