= Terrier (search engine) =

The Terrier IR Platform is a modular open source software for the rapid development of large-scale information retrieval applications. Terrier was developed by members of the Information Retrieval Research Group, Department of Computing Science, at the University of Glasgow.

A core version of Terrier is available as open source software under the Mozilla Public License.

Terrier is written in Java. Development started in 2004.

== Bibliography ==
- Terrier: A High Performance and Scalable Information Retrieval Platform (pdf) - Iadh Ounis, Gianni Amati, Vassilis Plachouras, Ben He, Craig Macdonald, and Christina Lioma. In Proceedings of ACM SIGIR'06 Workshop on Open Source Information Retrieval (OSIR 2006). 10 August, 2006. Seattle, Washington, USA.
- University of Glasgow at TREC 2006: Experiments in Terabyte and Enterprise Tracks with Terrier (pdf)- Christina Lioma, Craig Macdonald, Vassilis Plachouras, Jie Peng, Ben He and Iadh Ounis. In Proceedings of the 15th Text REtrieval Conference (TREC 2006), Gaithersburg, MD, USA, 2006.
- University of Glasgow at TREC 2005: Experiments in Terabyte and Enterprise Tracks with Terrier(pdf)- Craig Macdonald, Ben He, Vassilis Plachouras and Iadh Ounis. In Proceedings of the 14th Text REtrieval Conference (TREC 2005), Gaithersburg, MD, USA, 2005.
