= Seeks =

Open-source software

- Developers: Emmanuel Benazera, Mehdi Abaakouk, Pablo Joubert, Fabien Dupont
- Preview release: 0.4.1 / April 3, 2012; 14 years ago
- Written in: C++
- Operating system: Linux, BSD, OS X
- Type: Collaborative search engine
- License: AGPL-3.0-or-later
- Website: beniz.github.io/seeks/
- Repository: github.com/beniz/seeks

Seeks is a free and open-source project licensed under the GNU Affero General Public License version 3 (AGPL-3.0-or-later). It exists to create an alternative to the current market-leading search engines, driven by user concerns rather than corporate interests. The original manifesto was created by Emmanuel Benazera and Sylvio Drouin and published in October 2006. The project was under active development until April 2014, with both stable releases of the engine and revisions of the source code available for public use. In September 2011, Seeks won an innovation award at the Open World Forum Innovation Awards. The Seeks source code has not been updated since April 28, 2014 and no Seeks nodes have been usable since February 6, 2016.

== User control ==
Seeks aims to give the control of the ranking of results to the users, as search algorithms are often less accurate than humans. It relies on a distributed collaborative filter to let users personalize and share their preferred results on a search. Also, because of the openness of the source code, users can verify and modify the collaborative filter to fit its needs.

== Forms ==
Currently Seeks can be used in three main forms:

1. Public meta search engine – These are various individuals or entities that have created publicly accessible instances of the Seeks source code. This is the easiest way to begin using Seeks, as it operates in a similar manner to any other search engine.
2. Web proxy – Based on the popular Privoxy open source code, this allows setting up Seeks to operate as a web proxy which intercepts network requests for search queries and returns Seeks-based results.
3. Web application – This allows setting up an instance of the web search interface on a local system, and more customizing than available when using a public node.

== Features ==
- Results are automatically re-ranked based on user behavior.
- Results are automatically re-ranked based on behavior by similar users.
- The software can be run in a distributed, peer-to-peer (P2P) manner, which enhances privacy while distributing workload, and shares re-ranking data pseudonymously.
- As free and open source software, the source code and binaries are freely available and can be used for commercial and personal uses with many freedoms.
- It uses various commercial engines, public data sources or privately set search engines to generate its index and in this way serves as a meta-search engine while at the same time reranking results to optimize based on user behavior.

== See also ==
- YaCy – an open source search engine which includes its own crawler and stores search index in a distributed manner
- Collaborative search engine – a type of search engine which actively or passively accounts for user behavior in ranking results
- OpenSearch – a standard protocol for publishing search results in a consumable format
