= Mystery Seeker =

- The logo found at the website decorated with fog and a moon in the background.

- Screenshot Screenshot of mysteryseeker.com
- Website type: Search engine
- Available in: English
- Owner: Mystery Seeker
- Website: No Website
- Registration: None
- Launched: 2 October 2009; 17 years ago
- Current status: No Website
- Content license: Proprietary

Mystery Seeker was a website based on the Google search engine, that until November 30, 2009 had been known as Mystery Google. Upon a search query, Mystery Seeker returns the results from the previous search, so "you get what the person before you searched for." The WHOIS domain name record for mysterygoogle.com was created on 10 February 2009 with registrant Google Inc, but since February 26, 2017 it has had no website. The website has been featured in a number of technology blogs.

There is a trend among the people on Mystery Seeker to add so-called "missions", where the next user is asked to do something. For example, "Your mission is to copy and paste this until you see it again. Then and only then will you be a true ninja".

In November 2009, Mystery Seeker had 440,000 unique visitors, making it one of the most highly trafficked social entertainment sites online.
