= Forestle =

Search engine

Forestle was an ecologically inspired search engine created by Christian Kroll in Wittenberg, Germany, in 2008 and discontinued in 2011. Forestle supported rainforest conservation through donations of ad revenue and aimed to reduce CO_{2} emissions. It was similar to the search engine Ecosia, which plants new trees with its ad revenue. Forestle was briefly associated with Google before associating with Yahoo.

== Contributions to sustainability ==
Forestle saved 0.1 square meters (about 0.12 square yards) of rain forest per search event. It guaranteed to donate 90% of its advertising revenue to the Adopt an Acre program of is partner organization The Nature Conservancy. The Nature Conservancy used these donations by Forestle to sustain rainforests. As of December 9, 2009, about 2,910,000 square meters of rain forest have been saved. By November 20, 2010, about 9,250,000 square meters had been saved.

A Forestle search was also essentially CO_{2}-neutral, as Forestle.org offset the carbon-dioxide emissions caused by electricity consumed by all Forestle servers, the network infrastructure as well as the computers of each user by purchasing an equivalent amount of renewable energy certificates. The certificates were purchased from a part of the 10% of revenue left after conserving rain forest. This made Forestle one of the few web search sites that are green certified.

The number of search requests on Forestle.org continued to increase significantly: Within two months, it increased more than sixfold from about 4,000 per day on average in December 2008 to more than 24,000 per day in February 2009. The report about Forestle in a major German newspaper end of February 2009 transiently boosted the number of search events on Forestle.org within a week (3 March 2009) close to its all-time maximum. As of December 2009, the number of search events exceeds 200,000 per day.

The degree of impact of Forestle.org and similar kinds of 'green' search engines is discussed; the (now removed) note on Forestle to not click on advertisements to 'help' achieving larger advertisement revenues was particularly criticized.

== Features ==
The site pioneered a thumbnail website preview for all search results. Moreover, it offered a search with so-called indicators, for instance, one could directly search for 'Basic Income' on Wikipedia (instead of the entire WWW) by typing 'Wikipedia::Basic Income'. The language chosen for indicator search is automatically associated, so a search on the US web site http://us.Forestle.org or on the British web site http://uk.Forestle.org leads to a search on English Wikipedia http://en.wikipedia.org and a search on the German web site http://de.Forestle.org (or on the Austrian Website http://at.Forestle.org) leads a search on German Wikipedia http://de.wikipedia.org. Forestle also provided several browser plugins, could be added to iGoogle and was available in English and German (full versions) as well as in Spanish and Dutch (details partially in English)..

== Utopia Award ==
On November 27, 2009, Forestle received the Utopia Award as an exemplary organisation enabling us to live more sustainably. The Jury emphasizes that Forestle "offers a simple and strong possibility to contribute to protect existing rain forest through the use of an everyday [...] service" and that "thereby Forestle unfolds a high effectiveness and sharpens the consumers' sense for the impact of consumer behavior".

== Search engine partners ==
Forestle was associated to Google until Google revoked the site's search functionality after four days due to a dispute over whether their terms of service were being broken. Forestle.org stated that Google had not actually provided reasons for stopping the association. At the time, Forestle posted a message on their website stating that Google had contacted them and explained the reason for banning Forestle from using their Google Custom Search. The action by Google to not further support Forestle immediately drew international attention. Details about the conflict between Google and Forestle are debated. Forestle became associated with Yahoo later.

== Discontinuation ==
Forestle was discontinued and redirected to the similar search engine Ecosia on January 1, 2011.

== See also ==
- Blackle.com
- Ecosia
- List of search engines
