= Lexxe =

Search engine

Logo

Lexxe is an internet search engine that applies Natural Language Processing in its semantic search technology. Founded in 2005 by Dr. Hong Liang Qiao, Lexxe is based in Sydney, Australia. Today, Lexxe's key focus is on sentiment search with the launch of a news sentiment search site at News & Moods (www.newsandmoods.com).

Lexxe has experienced several stages of change of focus in search technology:

Lexxe launched its Alpha version in 2005, featuring Natural Language question answering (i.e. users could ask questions in English to the search engine apart from keyword searches — this feature has been suspended for redevelopment since 2010). It used only algorithms to extract answers from web pages, with no question-answer pair databases prepared in advance.

In 2011, Lexxe launched a beta version with a new search technology called Semantic Key. Semantic Keys enable users to query with a conceptual keyword (or a keyword with a special meaning, hence the term Semantic Key) in order to find instances under the concept, e.g. price → $5.95 or €200, color → red, yellow, white. For example, “price: a pound of apples”, “color: ferrari”. With initial 500 Semantic Keys at the Beta launch, Lexxe became the first search engine in the world to offer this unique and useful search technology to the users. The cost of building Semantic Keys was too heavy though.

In 2017, Lexxe launched News & Moods (www.newsandmoods.com), an open platform for news sentiment search, a first step towards sentiment search feature for the entire Internet search in Lexxe search engine. News & Moods also comes with smartphone apps in Android and iOS.
