= Taganode Local Search Engine =

The Open Local Search Engine from Taganode was a search engine specifically targeting mobile phones. It was based on local search algorithms to find new places of interest within a specified distance.

The Taganode search engine offered an Open Developer API for iPhone, Android, and other platforms.

The search engine was bandwidth optimized for mobile phones. The Taganode service was available in London, Rome, Venice, Amsterdam, Berlin, Sweden and in Denmark.
