= Kartoo =

Meta search engine

- Kartoo Search Results
- Website type: Web search engine
- Website: www.KartOO.com at the Wayback Machine (archived January 20, 2010)
- Launched: 2001
- Current status: Closed as of January 2010

KartOO was a meta search engine which displayed a visual interface. It operated from 2001 to early 2010.

== Interface ==
KartOO had an Adobe Flash GUI, as opposed to a text-based list of results. Its color scheme was to a degree reminiscent of Apple Computer's Aqua interface. Search results were presented as a "map", with blob-like masses of varying color connecting each item. On rollover of an individual result a bunch of red lines connected related links. KartOO sometimes helped to narrow down searches with a general topic. Every "blob" clicked added another word to the search query. The map would often succeed in presenting keywords or subtopics that defined the topic one was searching on, very much like an interactive spider diagram.

== History ==
It was co-founded in France by two cousins, Laurent Baleydier and Nicholas Baleydier. This project was launched in 2001. Most of their advertisement was through word of mouth.

In 2004, KartOO launched a new version called UJIKO (five nearby keys on a keyboard, similar to QWERTY). The interface looked more like a "jukebox" with the linked sites as playlists.

In January 2010 KartOO closed down, removing all content from the KartOO and UJIKO websites, but leaving a small message in French thanking its users for their support. By 2011 that message had been removed.
