= Otalo.com =

Otalo
- Company type: Private
- Founded: 2009
- Headquarters: Amherst, Massachusetts, USA
- Key people: Baer Tierkel; (CEO, Co-Founder); Mike Giles; (CTO, Co-Founder)
- Industry: Travel, Internet
- Website: otalo.com (Error 404, inactive)

Otalo.com (pronounced ō·tal·ō) was a fare aggregator and metasearch engine for vacation rentals, launched in 2009 by Bear Tierkel and Mike Giles in Amerherst, Massachusetts. It enabled its users to search across different vacation rental advertising sites using a single search.

== History ==
Before conceiving Otalo in 2009, Giles was previously the founder of the social bookmarking site Furl (acquired by LookSmart in 2004). Tierkel was previously the co-founder of the social citizenship site Localocracy (later sold to Huffington Post), and former chief marketing officer of the enterprise software company PeopleSoft.

They came up with the name of the site, Otalo, by combining the Zen symbol enzo ("O") with the Finnish word for house ("talo") after having found so many website names already taken.

The site launched in 2009 with over 200,000 searchable vacation rental listings. In February 2012, Otalo increased its search index to include 46 vacation rental websites, resulting in over 1.6 million vacation rental listings in 164 countries.
