= Getit =

Media company

Getit Infoservices Private Limited
- Screenshot
- Company type: Private
- Website type: E-commerce, E-Wallet, Grocery, Local search
- Area served: India
- Industry: internet
- Services: Online shopping, Online Grocery, mobile payments, Local search engine
- Employees: 3000 plus
- Subsidiaries: Getit Stores, Getit Grocery, Getit E-wallet, Mebelkart
- Website: www.askmegrocery.com www.askmepay.com www.askme.com
- Commercial: Yes
- Current status: Defunct

Getit is a directional media company based in India. Its services included e-wallet, e-commerce, grocery delivery, local search, yellow pages, white pages directories, classified media, and tele-information services. The company operated in 56 cities across India and provided services through print, voice, online, and mobile platforms.

The company became involved in legal proceedings before the National Company Law Tribunal concerning disputes among shareholders, including Sanjeev Gupta (former Managing Director) and Astro Entertainment Network Ltd. The cases involve matters related to shareholder disagreements and financial settlements.

== History ==
Getit Infoservices Private Ltd., formerly known as Getit Infomediary Ltd. /M&N Publications Ltd., introduced Yellow Pages in India under the brand name Getit Yellow Pages.

In December 2000, Getit released its telephone directory in Bangalore, which was scheduled to be distributed to all subscribers at telephone exchanges and customer service centres in January 2001.

By June 2003, Getit had launched the Getit Yellow Pages 2003 edition for consumer and household services, as well as industrial and commercial services.

In February 2013, local search and classifieds platform Getit appointed Jaspreet Bindra, a former Microsoft executive, as its new chief executive officer.

In 2013 Astro's Getit buys Infomedia YellowPages and AskMe from the Network18 group and launched Getit Bazaar, its online marketplace.

In 2016, Getit Infoservices Private Ltd struggled to pay employee salaries and dues to vendors. The financial strain arose amid disputes between the management and majority stakeholder Astro Entertainment Network Ltd., which accused Getit of excessive spending on brand marketing without sufficient returns. According to reports, Getit's management claimed that increased expenditures were approved by Astro to boost company valuation and that funding was expected to continue through early 2016.

Later Astro announced to exit the Indian market by selling its stake in Getit and threatened shutdown if key issues were not resolved. This prompted legal intervention, with the National Company Law Tribunal stepping in to issue a stay on the closure of Getit's operations, and company's unresolved financial liabilities.
