= Rollyo =

Internet search engine

Rollyo

Rollyo was a Yahoo!-powered search engine which allowed users to register accounts and create personalized search engines. Each search engine could include up to 25 websites/blogs chosen by the user. Search results were limited to the sites included in a particular search engine. Additionally, users could share their "rolled" engines with other contributors or post a mini search box to the user's website using HTML. It was also possible to add each "searchroll" to the Mozilla Firefox search bar and to make Rollyo the default search engine for Firefox.

The name "Rollyo" was a take on the phrase "roll your own." The site was founded by Dave Pell, built by Angus Durocher, and designed by Alex_Wright_(author) and Dan Cederholm. A private Beta was launched in August 2005 and the final product was released in September of the same year. It was closed some time before September 17, 2012.

== See also ==
- Google Co-op
- Eurekster
