= Priyo.com =

Bangla language internet portal & news company

www.priyo.com প্রিয়.কম
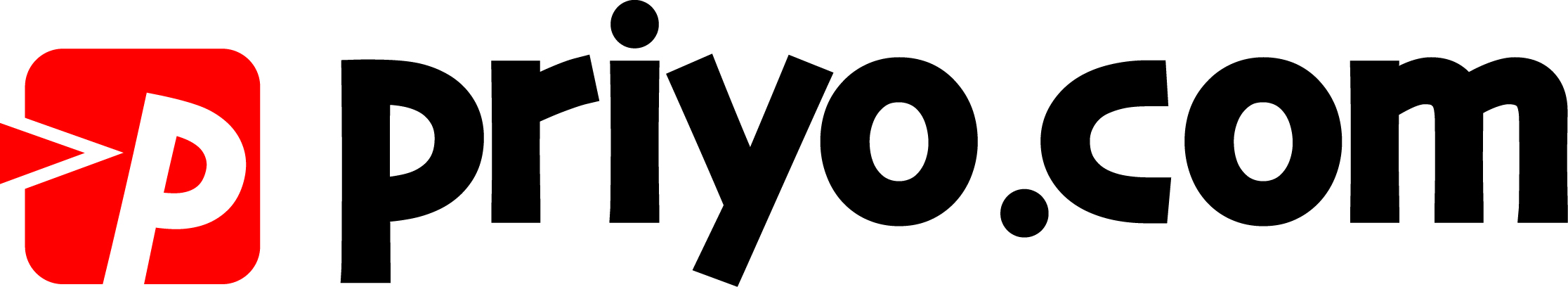
- Company type: Private
- Website type: News and web portal
- Available in: Bengali
- Founded: January 1, 2011; 15 years ago
- Headquarters: Silver Tower (10th Floor), Gulshan Avenue, Dhaka, Bangladesh
- Founder: Zakaria Swapan
- Industry: Digital Media
- Website: m.priyo.com
- Current status: Active

Priyo.com (Bengali: প্রিয়.কম), often referred to simply as Priyo, meaning "Dear" in English, is a Bengali internet portal and news media company that was founded by Zakaria Swapan in 2011. Based in Bangladesh and intended primarily for local readers, it features pop cultural news, local interest stories and political and cultural commentary in Bengali.

== History ==
In 2011, Priyo was founded in Dhaka, Bangladesh by Zakaria Swapan. It is one of the enlisted companies of the Bangladesh Association of Software and Services (BASIS), listed as Priyo Ltd. It is financed primarily by FENOX Venture Capital.
