= Daily Stocks =

Defunct stock market search engine site

Daily Stocks was a stock market search engine site in the late 1990s and early 2000s. Mike Onghai founded Daily Stocks in 1998. When reviewing price/sells ratio, IPOs, and earning reports, website users could set date parameters. It was one of the first websites to have the top 50 advancing and declining stocks for the American Stock Exchange, New York Stock Exchange, and NASDAQ. It also had company-specific facts and figures.
