= Groxis =

American technology company

- Industry: Software; Technology
- Founded: 2001
- Founder: Jean-Michel Decombe, Paul Hawken; R.J. Pittman
- Defunct: March 2009
- Headquarters: San Francisco, California, United States

Groxis was a tech company based in San Francisco, California that developed and marketed the web-based federated content access and visual search engine called Grokker.

== History ==
Groxis was founded by Jean-Michel Decombe, Paul Hawken, and R.J. Pittman in 2001, and ceased operations in March 2009.

Jean-Michel Decombe was Chief Technology Officer until 2006. He conceived the vision and invented the concepts underlying Groxis' flagship product, Grokker, for which he obtained several patents, including 6,879,332, 6,888,554, 7,036,093, and 7,290,223.

Paul Hawken was Executive Chairman until 2003. He raised the initial round of capital from angel investors. He assembled a team of advisors including Paul Saffo and John Seely Brown.

R.J. Pittman was Chief Executive Officer until 2006. He raised capital from top-tier venture capitalists. He was responsible for all pathfinder customer wins and key partnerships. He also set overall product direction, leading the company and moving Grokker.com into the top 5000 most visited websites on the Internet.

Groxis partners and customers included Sun Microsystems, Stanford University, Fast Search & Transfer, EBSCO Information Services, the Internet Public Library, and Amgen, as well as Yahoo!, Google, and Amazon.

The company won several industry awards including DEMOgod 2003, Always On Top 100, and Wired 100.

The name Grokker is inspired by the 1961 Robert A. Heinlein science fiction classic Stranger in a Strange Land, in which Grok is a Martian word meaning literally ‘to drink’ and metaphorically ‘to be one with.’ To grok something is to understand something so well that it is fully absorbed into oneself. It is to look at every problem, opportunity, action, and point of view from any and all perspectives.
