= Searchmedica =

Medical search engines

SearchMedica
- Developer: CMPMedica
- Initial release: 2006
- Type: Search Engine
- License: Freeware
- Website: www.searchmedica.co.uk, www.searchmedica.com, www.searchmedica.fr, www.searchmedica.es

SearchMedica was a series of free medical search engines built by doctors for doctors and other medical professionals, with localized versions for the United Kingdom, the United States, France and Spain.

== Description ==
SearchMedica was a specialist medical search engine for medical professionals. There were four localized versions:

1. Searchmedica.co.uk, which targeted UK GPs and medical professionals, and included clinical, drug and research data to the latest NICE, PCT or Department of Health guidelines.
2. SearchMedica.com with sections for nine therapeutic areas (cardiovascular, diabetes/endocrine, hematology/oncology, infectious, mental/nervous system, musculoskeletal, pediatric, radiology and respiratory) as well as all of medicine (content from all of the foregoing specialties and more) and practice management. Includes data from PubMed (Medline citations) as well as other health-related government websites and authoritative clinical sites, analyzed and approved by medical specialists.
3. Searchmedica.fr, a version for the French market with a focus on medical websites in French
4. Searchmedica.es, a Spanish version.

SearchMedica connected medical professionals with well-known, credible journals, peer-reviewed research, and evidence-based articles written for practicing healthcare professionals.

In addition to ranking search results according to both publication date and relevance, SearchMedica also allowed users to focus searches by categories such as journal content, evidence-based medicine, guidelines, and patient information.

SearchMedica was run by CMPMedica, a part of United Business Media, and was set up using search engine technology from Convera.

== History ==
The English version was the launched in June 2006, followed by the US version in August 2006 and the French version in February 2007. The Spanish version went live in the summer of 2007 and a relaunch occurred in January 2008.

None of the primary websites appear to be operational as of 2020.

== Business model ==
SearchMedica makes money through advertising. However, advertising does not bias the ranking of results in their search engine.
