= Enterprise search =

Software for finding documents

Enterprise search is software technology for searching data sources internal to a company, typically intranet and database content. The search is generally offered only to users internal to the company. Enterprise search can be contrasted with web search, which applies search technology to documents on the open web, and desktop search, which applies search technology to the content on a single computer. It can also be contrasted with on-site ecommerce search, which helps shoppers find products within a retail catalog.

Enterprise search systems index data and documents from a variety of sources such as: file systems, intranets, document management systems, e-mail, and databases. Many enterprise search systems integrate structured and unstructured data in their collections. Security is a central requirement in enterprise search, and access to documents is commonly controlled through document-level access control lists.

Enterprise search can be seen as a type of vertical search of an enterprise.

== Components of an enterprise search system ==
In an enterprise search system, content goes through various phases from source repository to search results:

=== Content awareness ===
Content awareness (or "content collection") is usually either a push or pull model. In the push model, a source system is integrated with the search engine in such a way that it connects to it and pushes new content directly to its APIs. This model is used when real-time indexing is important. In the pull model, the software gathers content from sources using a connector such as a web crawler or a database connector. The connector typically polls the source with certain intervals to look for new, updated or deleted content.

=== Content processing and analysis ===
Content from different sources may have many different formats or document types, such as XML, HTML, Office document formats or plain text. The content processing phase processes the incoming documents to plain text using document filters. It is also often necessary to normalize content in various ways to improve recall or precision. These may include stemming, lemmatization, synonym expansion, entity extraction, part of speech tagging.

As part of processing and analysis, tokenization is applied to split the content into tokens which is the basic matching unit. It is also common to normalize tokens to lower case to provide case-insensitive search, as well as to normalize accents to provide better recall.

=== Indexing ===
The resulting text is stored in an index, which is optimized for quick lookups without storing the full text of the document. The index may contain the dictionary of all unique words in the corpus as well as information about ranking and term frequency.

=== Query processing ===
Using a web page, the user issues a query to the system. The query consists of any terms the user enters as well as navigational actions such as faceting and paging information.

=== Matching ===
The processed query is then compared to the stored index, and the search system returns results (or "hits") referencing source documents that match. Some systems are able to present the document as it was indexed.

== See also ==
- Collaborative search engine
- Data defined storage
- Enterprise bookmarking
- Enterprise information access
- Faceted search
- Information extraction
- Knowledge management
- List of search engines
- Text mining
- Vertical search
