= Openverse =

Open-source search engine for open content

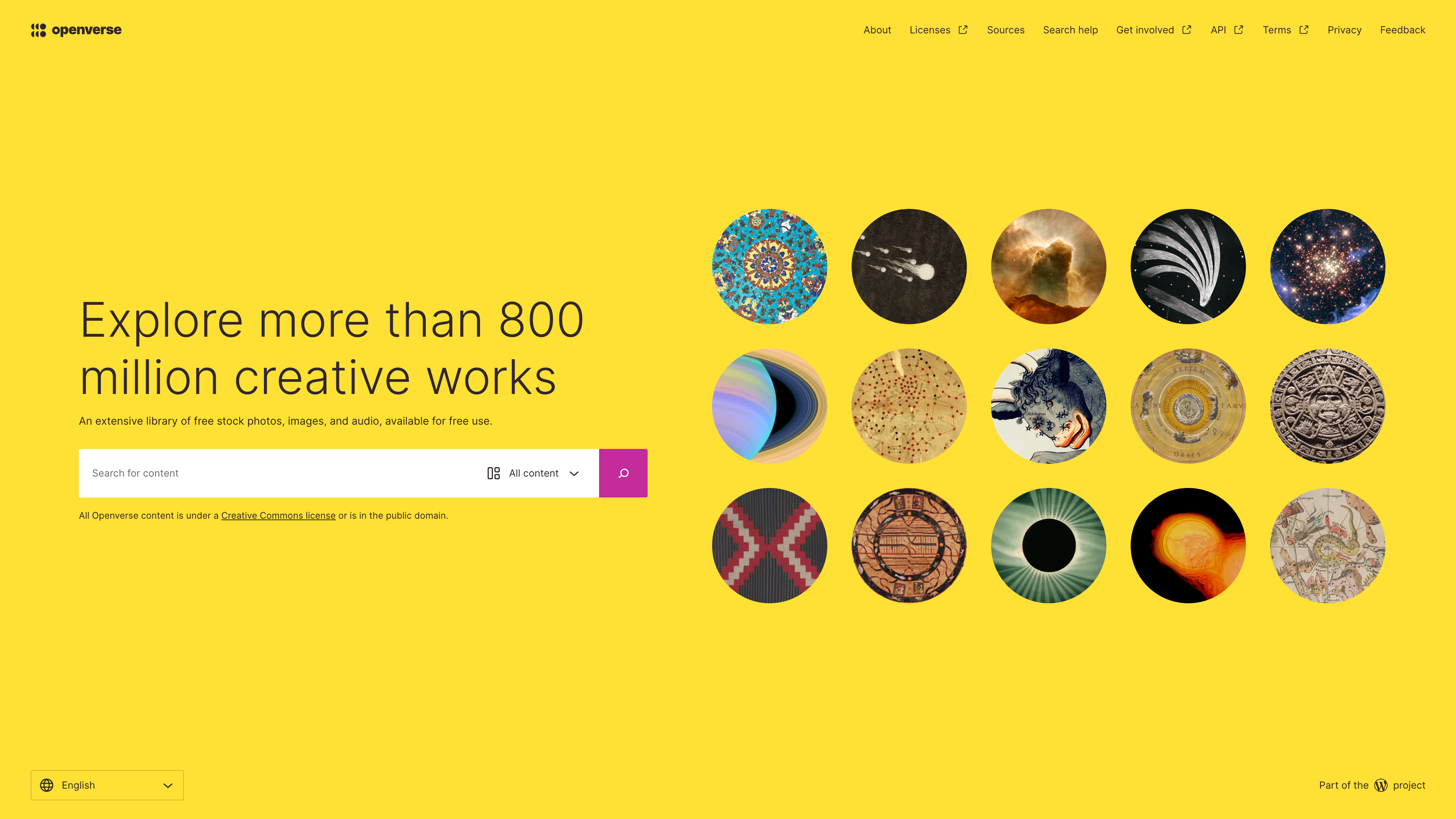
- Website type: Search engine
- Available in: Multilingual
- Owner: WordPress Foundation
- Website: openverse.org
- Current status: Active
- Written in: JavaScript, Python

Openverse is an open-source search engine for open content developed as part of the WordPress project. It searches Creative Commons licensed and public domain content from dozens of different sources. The software is open-source and is licensed under the MIT License.

Openverse indexes over 700 million items as of 2023.

== History ==
After acquiring Flickr, Yahoo! launched a creative commons search engine in 2005.

Journalism.co.uk recommended CC Search in 2013 for journalists.

In February 2017, Creative Commons announced a new version of CC Search, an open-source search engine for open content, and released a beta version. As of 2018, the search pulled from 13 different sources. A stable version of CC Search appeared in April 2019.

In December 2020, after Creative Commons staff changes, CC Search and a few other projects no longer had the necessary staff capacity. Those services went into maintenance mode, with the services remaining available while development was suspended.

In April–May 2021, Catherine Stihler (Creative Commons) and Matt Mullenweg (WordPress Foundation, Automattic Inc.) announced that CC Search joined the WordPress project. Automattic hired key members of the CC Search team and sponsors their contributions to the project as part of the Five for the Future initiative. A new name was also introduced, Openverse. Openverse is the successor to CC Search, and is developed from the same code base of CC Search. It aims to be a broader open content search engine, continue development work and expand features. The WordPress Foundation owns the Openverse trademark and its other intellectual property rights. In December 2020, the CC Search domain name was redirected to Openverse.

In January 2022, Openverse launched a redesigned user interface and support for searching audio files.

In February 2023, Openverse moved to the domain https://openverse.org and refreshed the user interface: adding a search history for recent searches. In September 2023, Openverse won the OE Awards for Excellence in Open Infrastructure.

== Search engine sources ==
Openverse searches content from over 45 different media sources, including Wikimedia Commons, Europeana, and Flickr.

== See also ==
- Open content
- Episode 8: The Commons of Images – WP Briefing, podcast episode of Openverse
