= ISYS Search Software =

ISYS Search Software was an Australian supplier of enterprise search software for information access, management, and re-use. The company marketed and sold a suite of embedded search, mobile access and information management infrastructure technologies.

== History ==
Established in 1988 by Ian Davies, ISYS previously marketed and sold enterprise search applications. Davies developed prototype text-retrieval software that would be suitable for use in large databases. The Australian market for the prototype software developed; and, in 1991, PC Week Magazine wrote a favourable review that assisted in attempts to break into the US market.

ISYS products competed with the Verity Ultraseek and the Google Search services, while its infrastructure and embedded search applications compete with Autonomy and FAST Search & Transfer (now a subsidiary of Microsoft).

In 2007, ISYS entered the Linux marketplace with the release of the ISYS:sdk and ISYS:web server for Linux platforms, the company's first foray into non-Windows environments. In 2009, ISYS released several new applications and a new suite for information access (see applications listed above).

=== Acquisition ===
In March 2012, ISYS Search Software Pty Ltd was acquired by Lexmark International, and integrated into its Perceptive Software division.

In July 2017, Hyland Software acquired Enterprise Software division of Lexmark and integrated Enterprise Search into its product suite

== Functionality ==
ISYS Search is capable of searching multiple disparate data sources, including Microsoft Office, WordPerfect, Open Office, HTML files, ZIP files, all major e-mail products, all SQLdata sources, SharePoint, Lotus Notes, and Lotus Domino. Some of ISYS's content-mining capabilities include automatic categorisation, entity extraction, parametric search, hit-highlighting and navigation, relevance ranking, and multiple query methods.
