= Vertical search =

Segmented search engine with specific content areas

A vertical search engine is distinct from a general web search engine, in that it focuses on a specific segment of online content. They are also called specialty or topical search engines. The vertical content area may be based on topicality, media type, or genre of content. Common verticals include shopping, the automotive industry, legal information, medical information, scholarly literature, job search and travel.

Some examples of vertical search engines designed for a variety of genres include the Library of Congress, Google Maps, LinkedIn, Zillow, and Kayak.

In contrast to general web search engines, which attempt to index large portions of the World Wide Web using a web crawler, vertical search engines typically use a focused crawler which attempts to index only relevant web pages to a pre-defined topic or set of topics. Some vertical search sites focus on individual verticals, while other sites include multiple vertical searches within one search engine.

== Benefits ==
Vertical search offers several potential benefits over general search engines:

- greater precision due to limited scope
- leverage domain knowledge including taxonomies and ontologies
- support of specific unique user tasks

Vertical search can be viewed as similar to enterprise search where the domain of focus is the enterprise, such as a company, government or organization. In 2013, consumer price comparison websites with integrated vertical search engines, such as FindTheBest (later Graphiq), drew large rounds of venture capital funding, indicating a growth trend for these applications of vertical search technology.

== Domain-specific search ==
Domain-specific search was popularized as a term by Andrew McCallum, Kamal Nigam, Jason Rennie, and Kristie Seymore, in A Machine Learning Approach to Building Domain-Specific Search Engines, published in 1999.

Domain-specific verticals focus on a specific topic, creating customized search experiences, that, due to the domain's limited corpus and clear relationships between concepts, provides highly relevant results for searchers.

Any general search engine would be indexing all the pages and searches in a breadth-first manner to collect documents. The spidering in domain-specific search engines more efficiently searches a small subset of documents by focusing on a particular set. Spidering accomplished with a reinforcement-learning framework has been found to be three times more efficient than breadth-first search.

=== DARPA's Memex program ===
In early 2014, the Defense Advanced Research Projects Agency (DARPA) released a statement on their website outlining the preliminary details of the "Memex", a three-year research program that aimed to develop new search technologies that could overcome some limitations of text-based search. Memex is a portmanteau of "memory" and "extension". The program's name was given in tribute to Vannevar Bush's original 1945 Memex invention, which served as inspiration.

DARPA expects the Memex technology developed in the research to be usable for search engines that can search for information on the Deep Web – the part of the Internet that is largely unreachable by commercial search engines, like Google or Yahoo. DARPA's website describes that "The goal is to invent better methods for interacting with and sharing information, so users can quickly and thoroughly organize and search subsets of information relevant to their individual interests". As reported in a 2015 Wired article, the search technology being developed in the Memex program "aims to shine a light on the dark web and uncover patterns and relationships in online data to help law enforcement and others track illegal activity".

DARPA designed the program to replace the centralized procedures used by commercial search engines, stating that the "creation of a new domain-specific indexing and search paradigm will provide mechanisms for improved content discovery, information extraction, information retrieval, user collaboration, and extension of current search capabilities to the deep web, the dark web, and nontraditional (e.g. multimedia) content". In April 2015, it was announced that parts of Memex would be open-sourced, with modules were available for download.
