= List of search engine software =

Presented below is a list of search engine software.

== Commercial ==
- Apache Lucene
- Apache Solr
- ApexKB
- Ark
- Arrowsmith System
- Chomp
- Cue
- dtSearch Engine
- Datafari Enterprise Edition
- Elasticsearch
- Endeca
- ExaSearch
- Intergator
- Koru search engine
- LEVAN
- Library Genesis
- Lookeen
- Meilisearch
- Million Short
- Mimvi
- Myriad Search
- Openbook
- OpenSearchServer
- Pubget
- Q-go
- Quixey
- Sci-Hub
- SinglePoint
- SMART Information Retrieval System
- Sparrho
- Sphinx
- Svensk mediedatabas
- Swiftype
- Thunderstone Software
- Yandex Data Factory
- Yaoota Shopping Engine
- Yebol
- Zedge

== Free ==
- Apache Lucene
- Apache Nutch
- Apache Solr
- Datafari Community Edition
- DocFetcher
- Gigablast
- Grub
- Ht-//Dig
- Isearch
- Meilisearch
- Typesense
- MnoGoSearch
- OpenSearch
- OpenSearchServer
- PHP-Crawler
- Manticore
- StrangeSearch
- SWISH-E
- Terrier Search Engine
- Vespa
- Xapian
- YaCy
- Zettair

== See also ==
- Search appliance
- Bilingual search engine
- Content discovery platform
- Document retrieval
- Incremental search
- Open Web Index
- Web crawler
