= Outline of search engines =

Overview of and topical guide to search engines

The following outline is provided as an overview of and topical guide to search engines.

Search engine – information retrieval system designed to help find information stored on a computer system. The search results are usually presented as a list, and are commonly called hits.

== Types of search engines ==
- Database search engine – search engine that operates on material stored in a digital database
- Desktop search engine –
- Distributed search engine – search engine where there is no central server. Unlike traditional centralized search engines, work such as crawling, data mining, indexing, and query processing is distributed among several peers in decentralized manner where there is no single point of control.
- Enterprise search engine – search engine employed on and for access to the information on an organization's computer network.
- Human search engine – uses human participation to filter the search results and assist users in clarifying their search request. The goal is to provide users with a limited number of relevant results, as opposed to traditional search engines that often return a large number of results that may or may not be relevant.
- Hybrid search engine – uses different types of data with or without ontologies to produce the algorithmically generated results based on web crawling. Previous types of search engines only use text to generate their results.
- Intelligent medical search engine
- Metasearch engine – search tool[1] that sends user requests to several other search engines and/or databases and aggregates the results into a single list or displays them according to their source. Metasearch engines enable users to enter search criteria once and access several search engines simultaneously.
  - Search aggregator
- Organic search engine – manually operated search service which uses a combination of computer algorithms and human researchers to look up a search query. A search query submitted to an organic search engine is analysed by a human operator who researches the query then formats the response to the user.
- Web search engine – designed to search for information on the World Wide Web and FTP servers. The search results are generally presented in a list of results often referred to as SERPS, or "search engine results pages".
  - Audio search engine – web-based search engine which crawls the web for audio content.
  - Collaborative search engine – emerging trend for Web search and Enterprise search within company intranets. CSEs let users concert their efforts in information retrieval (IR) activities, share information resources collaboratively using knowledge tags, and allow experts to guide less experienced people through their searches.
  - Social search engine – type of web search that takes into account the Social Graph of the person initiating the search query.
  - Video search engine – web-based search engine which crawls the web for video content. Some video search engines parse externally hosted content while others allow content to be uploaded and hosted on their own servers.
- Visual search engine – designed to search for information on the World Wide Web through the input of an image or a search engine with a visual display of the search results. Information may consist of web pages, locations, other images and other types of documents. This type of search engines is mostly used to search on the mobile Internet through an image of an unknown object (unknown search query).

== Specific search engines ==
List of search engines

== Search engine software ==
- List of search engine software

== Search-based applications ==
Search-based application –

- Bibliographic database
- Online database
  - List of online databases
    - List of academic databases and search engines
- Digital library
  - List of digital library projects
    - List of online magazines
    - Wikipedia:List of online newspaper archives
- Electronic journal
  - Lists of academic journals
    - List of open-access journals
- Digital encyclopedia
  - Internet encyclopedia
    - List of online encyclopedias
- Wiki
  - List of wikis
- Digital dictionary
  - Online dictionary
    - List of online dictionaries

== Search engine technology ==
Search engine technology

- Search algorithm
- Search engine image protection
- Search engine indexing
- Search engine optimization
- Search engine results page
- Search engine software
- Search engine submission
  - Search engine optimization copywriting
- Web crawler

== Search engine marketing ==
Search engine marketing

- Pay per click
- Cost per impression
- Search analytics
- Web analytics

== Persons influential in search engines ==
- Sergey Brin
- Larry Page
- Eric Schmidt

== See also ==
- Outline of the Internet
  - Outline of Google
- Human flesh search engine
