= Comparison of enterprise bookmarking platforms =

The following tables compare enterprise bookmarking platforms.

== General ==
The table provides an overview of Enterprise Bookmarking platforms. The platforms listed refer to an application that is installed on a web server (usually requiring MySQL or another database and PHP, perl, Python, or some other language for web apps).

| Software | Developed by | Latest stable release | Cost (USD) | Contract support offered | Community website support | Open source | Multilingual | Programming language | User Interface | Notes |
|---|---|---|---|---|---|---|---|---|---|---|
| Connectbeam | Connectbeam | Spotlight 3.1 (2008-6) | per instance | Yes | No | No | No | binary only | browser | none |
| Dogear | IBM Corporation | 2.0.1 (2009-3) | per instance | Yes | Yes | No | Yes | binary only | browser | does not run on mySQL, requires IBM DB2 9.1 FP5, Oracle Database 10g 10.2.0.3, Microsoft SQL Server 2005 Enterprise Edition |
| Jumper 2.0 | Jumper Networks | 2.0.1.7 (2010-7) | Free | Yes | Yes | Yes - GPL | Yes | JavaScript & PHP | browser | runs on mySQL database for storing tag profiles. Can also be configured to run on Oracle Database 10g or Microsoft SQL Server 2005 Enterprise Edition |
| Knowledge Plaza | Knowledge Plaza | 2.3.18 | free trial, starts at €35/month/instance | Yes | Yes | No | Yes | JavaScript and Python (programming language) | browser | Software-as-a-Service |
| Scuttle | Scuttle | 0.9.0 (2013-04) | Free | No | No | Yes - GPL | No | JavaScript & PHP | browser | still in alpha stage |

== Date and content types ==
This table lists the types of data that can be tagged.

| Software | Web pages | Documents | Images | Video | Emails | Contacts | Book references | Discussions | Wiki pages | Database tables | Flat-files | Notes |
|---|---|---|---|---|---|---|---|---|---|---|---|---|
| Connectbeam | Yes | Yes | No | No | Yes | No | No | No | No | No | No | none |
| Dogear | Yes | Yes | No | No | No | No | No | No | No | No | No | none |
| Jumper 2.0 | Yes | Yes | Yes | Yes | Yes | No | Yes | No | Yes | Yes | Yes | none |
| Knowledge Plaza | Yes | Yes | Yes | Yes | Yes | Yes | Yes | Yes | Yes | No | No | none |
| Scuttle | Yes | No | No | No | No | No | No | No | No | No | No | none |

== Content enrichment capabilities ==
Tags and metadata can be used to enrich previously described types of data and content. This table lists the default capabilities each platform provides.

| Software | Keywords | Descriptions | Custom Tag Fields | Metadata | Knowledge Tags | Notes |
|---|---|---|---|---|---|---|
| Connectbeam | Yes | Yes | No | No | No | none |
| Dogear | Yes | No | No | No | No | none |
| Jumper 2.0 | Yes | Yes | Yes | Yes | Yes | none |
| Knowledge Plaza | Yes | Yes | Yes | Yes | No | none |
| Scuttle | Yes | Yes | No | No | No | none |

== Tag management capabilities ==
Enterprise bookmarking tools differ from social bookmarking tools in the way that they often have to meet taxonomy constraints. Tag management capabilities are the uphill (e.g. faceted classification, predefined tags) and downhill gardening (e.g. tag renaming, moving, merging) abilities that can be put in place to manage the folksonomy generated from user tagging.

| Software | Faceted classification | Restricted facets | Mandatory facets | Predefined tags | Related/synonym tags | Notes |
|---|---|---|---|---|---|---|
| Connectbeam | No | No | No | No | No | none |
| Dogear | No | No | No | No | No | none |
| Jumper 2.0 | Yes | Yes | Yes | Yes | No | none |
| Knowledge Plaza | Yes | Yes | Yes | Yes | Yes | none |
| Scuttle | No | No | No | No | No | none |

== Platform and security capabilities ==
Security abilities at the platform level:

- On-premises, refers to an application that is installed on a web server behind the corporate firewall.
- Hosted, refers to a centrally-hosted website that is outside the corporate firewall
- Encryption level, refers to the level of encryption enforced by the application server

Security abilities at the application level:

- Access permissions, refers to the ability to define a list of users who have access to the application.
- Information-level permissions, refers to the ability to define per data/content item (e.g. a document) its accessibility/visibility within the application (invisible, downloadable, etc.)
- Workspace-level permissions, refers to the ability to create team spaces with different accessibility/visibility settings.
- Role-level permissions, refers to the ability to assign roles to users (e.g. administrator, guest, workspace expert) which will also affect accessibility/visibility settings.

| Software | Hosted Platform | On-Premises Platform | Encryption level | Multi-user support | Access permissions | LDAP integration | Information-level permissions | Workspace-level permissions | Role-level permissions | Notes |
|---|---|---|---|---|---|---|---|---|---|---|
| Connectbeam | Yes | Yes | ? | Yes | Yes | No | ? | ? | ? | none |
| Dogear | No | Yes | ? | Yes | Yes | Yes | ? | ? | ? | The Lotus Connection Suite with Dogear runs on the AIX (Unix) operating system |
| Jumper 2.0 | No | Yes | HTTPS optionally available | Yes | Yes | Yes | Yes | Yes | Yes | LDAP integration is available |
| Knowledge Plaza | Yes | Yes | HTTPS with high-grade 256-bit AES | Yes | Yes | Yes | Yes | Yes | Yes | none |
| Scuttle | No | Yes | HTTPS optionally available | No | Yes | No | Yes | ? | | none |

== Server operating system support ==
In the case of web applications, this describes the server OS. For centrally-hosted websites that are proprietary, this is not applicable. Any client OS can connect to a web service unless stated otherwise in a footnote.

| Software | Windows | Mac OS X | Linux | BSD | Unix | IIS | Apache | Notes |
|---|---|---|---|---|---|---|---|---|
| Connectbeam | Yes | No | No | No | No | Yes | No | none |
| Dogear | Yes | Yes | Yes | No | Yes | No | No | requires IBM WebSphere Application Server 6.1.0.13 for the web server |
| Jumper 2.0 | Yes | Yes | Yes | Yes | Yes | Yes | Yes | none |
| Knowledge Plaza | No | No | Yes | No | No | No | No | No OS management required. Infrastructure-as-a-Service for on-premises installation. |
| Scuttle | Yes | Yes | Yes | Yes | Yes | Yes | Yes | none |

== See also ==
- List of social bookmarking websites
- Comparison of reference management software
- List of social software
