= OpenSearch =

OpenSearch may refer to:

- OpenSearch (specification), an open standard for the publishing of search results
- OpenSearch (software), a fork of Elasticsearch and Kibana by Amazon Web Services

== See also ==
- OpenSearchServer, an open source application server for the development of search engines
- Open Search Foundation, a foundation committed to open, transparent and independent internet search in Europe; see Search engine privacy § Privacy organizations
