= List of search appliance vendors =

A search appliance is a type of computer which is attached to a corporate network for the purpose of indexing the content shared across that network in a way that is similar to a web search engine. It may be made accessible through a public web interface or restricted to users of that network. A search appliance is usually made up of: a gathering component, a standardizing component, a data storage area, a search component, a user interface component, and a management interface component.

== Vendors of search appliances ==
- Fabasoft
- Google
- InfoLibrarian Search Appliance™
- Maxxcat
- Searchdaimon
- Thunderstone

== Former/defunct vendors of search appliances ==
- Black Tulip Systems
- Google Search Appliance
- Index Engines
- Munax
- Perfect Search Appliance
