= Knowledge Web =

Knowledge Web is the name of four different projects:

- The Knowledge Web Project supervised by James Burke
- A project under the European Sixth Framework Program
- An example of a knowledge web software platform is the Jumper 2.0 open source project
- The Knowledge Web created by AFAC (Australasian Fire and Emergency Service Authorities Council previously Australasian Fire Authorities Council) for collaboration on Fire and Emergency Services for Australasia
