= Single point =

Single point may refer to:

- Single (football), a point score in Canadian football
- Any machining process employing a single-point cutting tool, including:
  - Single-point thread cutting—a method of threading (manufacturing)
  - Single-point diamond turning which uses diamond because it is extremely hard
- Single-point, underwing aviation fueling
- Single-point urban interchange, a type of highway interchange
- SinglePoint, address management software

== See also ==
- Single point of failure
