= Tag management =

Software feature

Tag management is the ability to manage user-generated tags (also known as categories, taxonomies or folksonomies) within collaborative software. Tag management features and processes are put in place to encourage cross-user consistency, navigation efficiency and compliance with an existing taxonomy.

== Tag management a priori ==
The tags that users will be able to use can be controlled up-hill (before they have entered the data set) by

- Faceted classification, categorizing tags in facets (e.g. organization or place facet)
- Predefining tags, authority lists of tags can be created and suggested to users
- Restricting tag creation, allow users to create or not new tags other than predefined tags
- Mandatory facets, meaning a user must categorize each item with at least a tag from this facet
- Relating tags, meaning selecting a tag will also display the results of other tags related to it (e.g. synonyms or translations)

== Tag management a posteriori ==
Tags can be gardened down-hill (after they have entered the data set) by

- Renaming tags (e.g. typos)
- Deleting tags
- Moving tags to correct facets (e.g. an organization name)
- Merging tags (e.g. single and plural words)

== Examples of tag management ==
- Content management systems: WordPress, Microsoft SharePoint Drupal,
- Knowledge management software: Elium
- Enterprise bookmarking tools: Jumper 2.0
