= ChaCha (search engine) =

Human-guided search engine

Cha-Cha
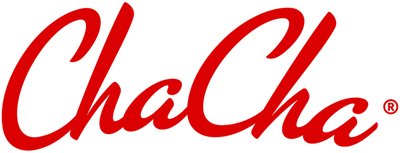
- Founded: September 1, 2006; 20 years ago in Carmel, Indiana
- Defunct: December 12, 2016
- Headquarters: Carmel, Indiana, United States
- Area served: Worldwide
- Key people: Scott Jones (founder)
- Website: chacha.com (defunct)

ChaCha was an American human-guided search engine that provided free, real-time answers to any question, through its website, or by using one of the company's mobile apps.

The company, founded in 2006 by Scott A. Jones and Brad Bostic, was based in Carmel, Indiana, United States, part of the Indianapolis metropolitan area. Its name comes from the Mandarin Chinese word cha (Chinese: 查; pinyin: chá; Wade–Giles: ch'a), which means "to search."

== History ==
An alpha version of ChaCha was launched on September 1, 2006. A beta version was introduced on November 6, 2006. ChaCha said 20,000 guides had registered by year's end and that it had raised US$6 million in development funds, including support from Bezos Expeditions, a personal investment firm owned by Jeff Bezos, the entrepreneur behind Amazon.com.

By January 2008, ChaCha had 5,000 freelance guides with at least 500 working at any one time. In the same year, the company launched a text-based service where users could text a question to 242-242 (CHA-CHA) and get an answer texted back to them.

MogoNews.com reported that ChaCha's first round of equity financing was $14 million plus a $2 million grant from 21st Century Technology Fund.

ChaCha announced on March 17, 2009, a new round of equity financing totaling US$12 million, while also laying off 25 people and reducing the salaries of the 56 remaining employees by 10 percent. The renewed investment brought total venture capital to an acknowledged $43 million, though an independent estimate placed it at $58 million. A month later, co-founder Brad Bostic stepped down as company president, saying ChaCha no longer needed him for day-to-day operations. Bostic noted that the company had been struggling for profitability in the Great Recession.

In August 2011, ChaCha launched its text messaging-based service in the United Kingdom.

On April 20, 2012, ChaCha shut down operations in the United Kingdom; the company stated the reason for ending UK operations was that "adoption rates for new price-competitive services are quite low in the UK."

On December 12, 2016, ChaCha shut down operations due to declining advertising revenue, which left it unable to service its debt.

== Products ==
=== Desktop search ===
ChaCha was founded with the intention to offer human-guided search from within a web browser and for the search engine to learn from the results provided by their freelancers. The system offered a chat on the left side of the page where users could chat with the guides and conclude their search. The center of the page contained results that a guide could add or remove (later users could also add or remove these results). The right side of the page contained ads that were relevant to the search.

Desktop search was phased out in April 2008, in favor of mobile products.

=== Mobile search ===
Users were able to send an SMS message with their question to 242–242, where Guides would then answer it. Standard messaging fees could apply, but ChaCha never charged additional fees.

=== Voice search ===
ChaCha launched its beta version of a call-in search service on April 1, 2008, while discontinuing its less effective guided web search. Users called a toll-free number (800-2ChaCha) to have a human answer their questions via SMS.

=== Mobile marketing ===
In July 2008, ChaCha launched its first mobile marketing campaign with Coca-Cola to promote its My Coke Rewards program to users interested in NASCAR racing. Fox News reported that ChaCha planned by mid-2008 to charge users $5–10 per month once they exceeded 10 queries. However, by May 2009, no additional fees had been implemented, nor had any plans been officially announced by a reliable source.

In November 2008, ChaCha launched its SMS Advertising Platform at ad:tech New York City.

In March 2009, ChaCha reported 30 million "impressions per month" and "3.6 million users" since January 2008. An ESPN 2009 article stated that ChaCha was getting about 1,000,000 questions each day according to their tipsheets. A former Yahoo executive opened a New York City office for ChaCha in hopes of increasing advertising.

In April 2009, Rick Reilly spent some time working at ChaCha for an article in ESPN The Magazine.
