= Database search engine =

A database search engine is a search engine that operates on material stored in a digital database.

== Search engines ==
Categories of search engine software include:

- Web search or full-text search (e.g. Lucene).
- Database or structured data search (e.g. Dieselpoint).
- Mixed or enterprise search (e.g. Google Search Appliance).

The largest online directories, such as Google and Yahoo, utilize thousands of computers to process billions of website documents using web crawlers or spiders (software), returning results for thousands of searches per second. Processing high query volumes requires software to run in a distributed environment with redundancy.

== Components ==
Searching for textual content in databases or structured data formats (such as XML and CSV) presents special challenges and opportunities which specialized search engines resolve. Databases allow logical queries such as the use of multi-field Boolean logic, while full-text searches do not. "Crawling" (a human by-eye search) is not necessary to find information stored in a database because the data is already structured. Indexing the data allows for faster searches.

Database search engines are usually included with major database software products.

== Applications ==
Database search technology is used by large public and private entities including government database services, e-commerce companies, online advertising platforms, telecommunications service providers and other consumers with a need to access information in large repositories.

== See also ==
- Outline of search engines
- List of search engines
