= Hera Hjartardóttir =

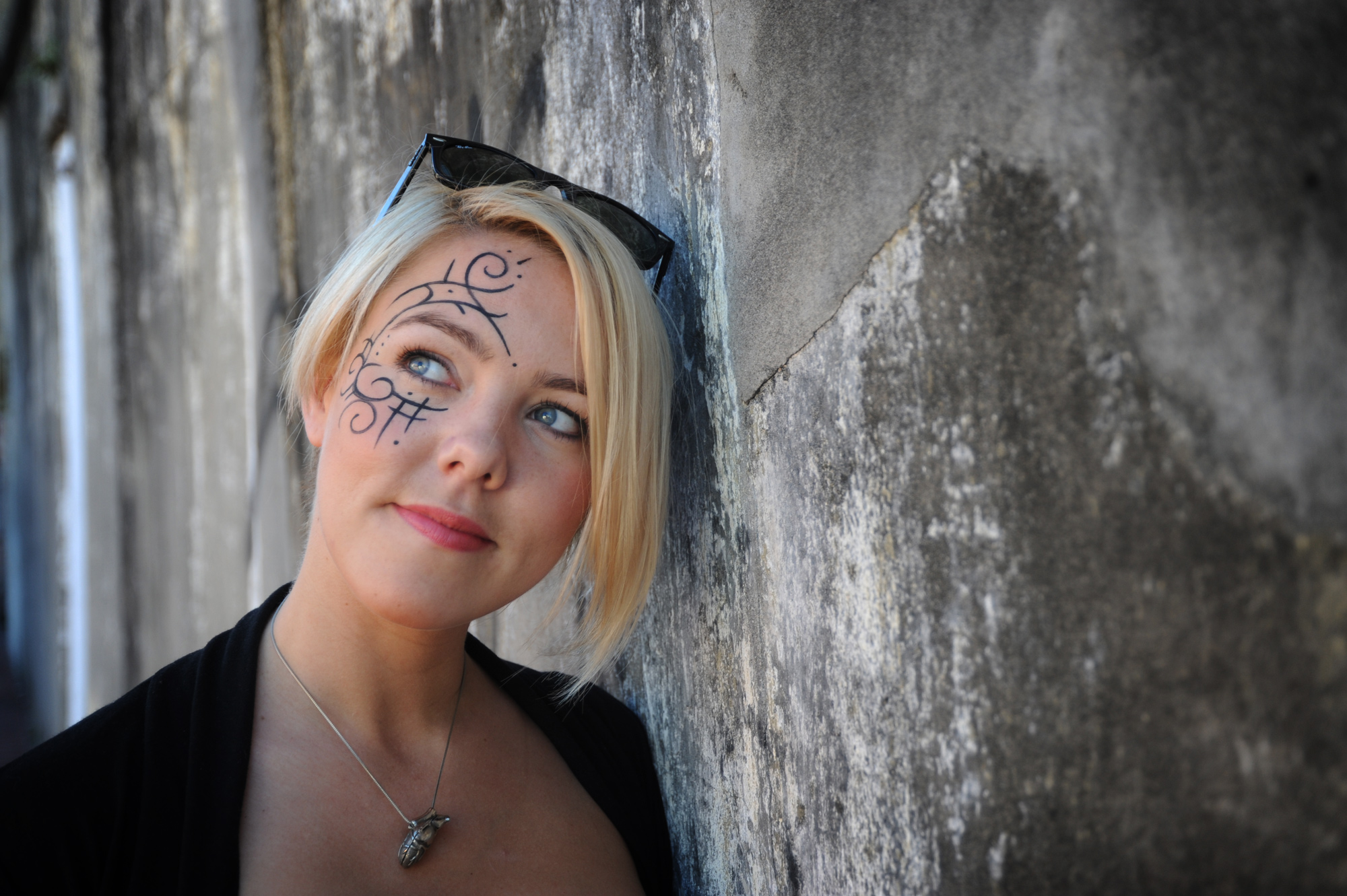
- Hera photographed in 2010 by Kyle Cassidy.

Background information
- Also known as: Hera
- Born: 1 April 1983 (age 42) Reykjavík, Iceland
- Origin: Iceland; New Zealand
- Genres: Pop/Folk
- Instrument(s): Vocals guitar
- Years active: 1999–present
- Labels: Sena
- Website: herasings.com

Hera (born 1 April 1983 in Reykjavík, Iceland) is a singer-songwriter from Iceland who now lives in Christchurch, New Zealand. She divides her time between her home in New Zealand and a regular European touring schedule. In 2002, she was named Best Female Singer at the Icelandic Music Awards.

A unique physical characteristic is the varying facial art she applies before appearances. She says it is "inspired by moko and also by Celtic warrior paint". It is intended to represent both her Icelandic and New Zealand heritage. The symbols represent aspects of her life and family, but she keeps most of their meanings private.

== Biography ==
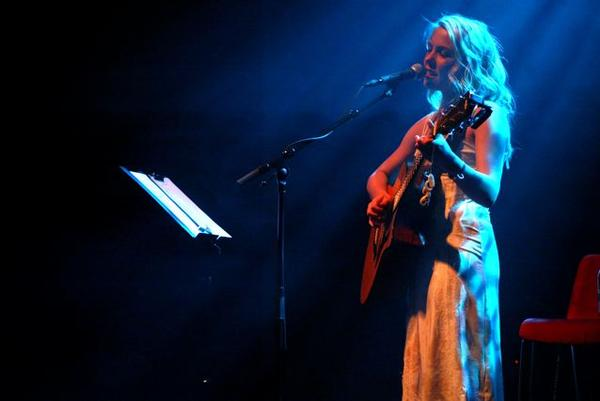
Hera in concert

Hera was born in Reykjavík, Iceland and her family moved to Christchurch, New Zealand when she was 13. She started learning classical guitar at the age of eight, and then jazz guitar after a neighbour taught her how to play The Girl From Ipanema. Once she learned how to play and sing at the same time, she began writing her own songs. At 16 she released her first album Homemade, so named because it was recorded at home.

Two years later, Hera released her second independently produced album Not So Sweet and her career started to take off after a track from it, Itchy Palms, was chosen as the title track for the award winning Icelandic film Hafið (The Sea). The song resulted in her being nominated for two awards at the 2002 Icelandic Music Awards. She won for 'Best Female Singer', a category that had only ever been won by Björk or Emilíana Torrini in the ten-year history of the awards.

Her song Makebelieve from her third album Not Your Type! was a finalist in the 2002 USA Songwriting Competition, and became the third most played song on Icelandic National Radio in 2003. Her third and subsequent studio albums have been released on Icelandic record label Sena.

The year 2003 saw the release of her fourth studio album (and first Icelandic language recording) Hafið þennan dag. Since that time she has toured Iceland and Europe extensively and has opened for artists such as Nick Cave and Joe Cocker.

Her fifth album Don't Play This was released in 2005 and the same year, she played at the Glastonbury Music Festival. In 2007, she played her first gigs in the United States including a performance at SXSW in Austin, Texas.

Hera released her first live album in 2008 titled Live at AL's, recorded on 16 May 2008 at Christchurch music venue Al's Bar. In June of that same year, she began her 2008 European tour with a repeat trip to perform at Glastonbury. Hera's latest album, Rattle My Bones, was released on 15 June 2011.

Her song Feels So Good features on the Yike Bike promotional video.

== Discography ==
=== Studio albums ===
- Homemade (1999)
- Not So Sweet (2001)
- Not Your Type! (2002)
- Hafið þennan dag (2003). Achieved Gold status in Iceland in 2005.
- Don't Play This (2005)
- Rattle My Bones (2011)
- Hera (2020)

=== Live albums ===
- Live at AL's (2008)
- Live at York St. (With Jed Parsons) (2013)

=== Singles ===
- Talað við gluggann (2003 – Iceland)
- I Wanna Run (Live) (2004 – Iceland)
- Feathers in a Bag (2005 – Iceland)
- Feels So Good (2007 – Iceland)
- Issues (with Jed Parsons) (2013)

=== Compilations ===
- Ljósalagið (2003)
- Íslensk ástarljóð (2003)
- Stóra stundin okkar (2004)
- Svona er sumarið 2005 (2005)
- Svona er sumarið 2006 (2006)
- Bubbi Morthens – 06.06.06 (2006)
- Pældu í því sem pælandi er í (2006)
- Óskalögin 10 (2006)
- Ballöður (2007)
- Ýmsir – 100 íslensk barnalög (2007)
- 100 íslenskar ballöður (2009)
- 100 íslensk í ferðalagið (2009)
- 100 íslensk lög í fríið (2010)
- 100 vinsæl barnalög (2010)
- Það er bara þú (2011)

== Facial artwork ==
Here are some variations of the facial art:

- 2001 Painting the clouds
- 2008 Iceland
- 2004 without facial art
- Video of Makebelieve Girl recording session in Iceland without facial art
