= Judy's Book =

- Company type: Private
- Website type: Local Social Search, Local Ratings and Reviews
- Headquarters: Seattle, United States
- Area served: Worldwide
- Founders: Andy Sack (Co-founder); Chris DeVore (Co-founder)
- Key people: David Niu (board member); Geoff Entress (board member); Andy Liu (board member); Mike Ma (board member); Ali Alami (General Manager)
- Industry: Internet
- Employees: 7
- Subsidiaries: snappd.it
- Website: www.judysbook.com
- Advertising: Banner ads, referral marketing
- Launched: 2004
- Current status: Active

Judy's Book is a U.S. social search tool and online yellow pages to locate and review local businesses and professional services.

== History ==
In 2004, Andy Sack (Founders Co-op, Kefta, Abuzz, Firefly Network) and Chris DeVore (Founders Co-op, Sapient Corporation, Adjacency) founded Judy's Book with a US $2.5 million seed funding that they were able to raise. The social networking-based local search tool allows small businesses to promote themselves and users to browse through listings to locate businesses and professionals in their area and rate and review their experiences.

=== Marketing tactics ===
In 2005, in an effort to get the website off the ground, the company offered iPods to anyone who submitted 50 reviews of local businesses. While the then-owners and founders of Judy's Book, Andy and Chris, refused to reveal how many people won iPods or how many reviews were submitted, Sack announced that their marketing efforts were successful as the website saw a 50–60% increase in reviews and member registrations every month.

In 2006, the website gave out $100 gift certificates every day from February 16 until March 5 to the person who had written the most reviews that day.

Also in 2006, in an attempt to further increase traffic to the website, Judy's Book announced that it was partnering with Local.com. All reviews written on Judy's Book were included in Local.com's search results.

In 2006, Judy's Book claimed trademark on the term social search.

=== Collapse ===
The company changed focus in 2006 when it appeared that its original business model was failing. The company moved towards the shopping angle and local deals. However, after burning through $10.5M in capital that had been raised over the three years of its operation, and unable to generate enough revenue to keep the website afloat, the company began looking for a new buyer. The CEO announced the company would be shutting down operations in October 2007.

== Change of ownership and management ==
In October 2008, nearly one year from the day Judy's Book laid off nearly all of its staff and was declared "deadpooled", Seattle-based angel investors Geoff Entress Madrona Venture Group, David Niu (founder of BuddyTV) and Andy Liu (CEO of BuddyTV) bought the company from the original founders, Andy and Chris. The group are currently working together on another venture capital, Founders Co-op. However, in an interview with one of the owners, Andy Liu noted that the purchase of Judy's Book took place before they invested in the Internet incubator, Founders Co-op. While none of the investors were willing to reveal how much was paid in its acquisition, it is assumed to be far less than the $10.5M the original founders had put in the start-up. The website is currently led by General Manager, Ali Alami.

In June 2012, the new management of Judy's Book, Ali Alami, launched KidScore which is an out-of-glance measure of a location's friendliness towards children.

In 2017, Judy's Book was acquired by Advice Interactive Group, a local search company. url=http://www.advicelocal.com
