= Sproose =

Consumer search engine

Sproose.com
- Company type: Internet
- Website type: Search Engine with user voting
- Available in: English, German, French, Spanish
- Headquarters: Danville, California, USA
- Founder: Bob Pack
- Website: www.sproose.com
- Advertising: CPC text ads
- Launched: 2007
- Current status: closed

Sproose was a consumer search engine launched in August 2007 by founder Bob Pack. Sproose provided web search results from partners including MSN, Yahoo! and Ask.com. Sproose intended to have better-quality results than algorithmic search engines because its users were able to influence the ranking order of the search results by voting for websites (which moved them up in the order of search results) and deleting bad or spam results. It had been compared to Digg and Mahalo.com, among other social search websites.

The domain sproose.com is now owned by a British artist.

== Use of the site ==
Registration was not required to search on Sproose. If a user voted for a website, the vote was saved temporarily. In order to save the voted sites permanently, a user had to sign up for an account. When a user registered with Sproose, a personal profile page was created. Each time a site was voted on, a thumbnail and URL of the site would be posted on the user's profile page, which may be public or private. Users could comment on each website; comments were visible to other users.

In January 2009, Sproose launched a recommendation engine and voting platform. The recommendation engine allowed users to rate and vote for content on partnered websites, and it allowed for more information to be delivered to a user from the partnered site. It also allowed sharing of information through its "widgets" on social networks such as Facebook.

== Company background ==
Sproose was privately held. The management team was:

- Bob Pack – Founder and CEO
- Gus Bourg – Vice President of Search Technology
- Steve Bourg – Vice President of Network Technology
- Stefan Groschupf – CTO
