= Sears Israel =

Israeli department store chain

- Type: Subsidiary
- Industry: Retail
- Founded: Herzliya, Israel (2009)
- Headquarters: Herzliya, Israel
- Number of locations: 2,248 (2010); 858 (2012) (US)
- Parent: Sears Holdings
- Website: www.sears.co.il

Sears Israel (formally S.H.C. Israel, previously named Delver) was Sears Holdings Corporation's Israeli branch, owning the site ShopYourWay.

The company is located in Herzeliya, Israel.

== History ==
=== Startup days ===
Delver started as a web search engine that displayed results prioritized based upon the searcher’s social network and community. It worked by indexing users’ social connections (the social graph) and their online contributions, and ranking search results by the relation between the searcher and target documents. Such results may include blogs, photos, videos, web pages, articles, reviews and more.

The concept behind Delver was first introduced in DEMO'08, and an initial public version was launched later that year on July 15. In November that year, Delver announced integration with Yahoo!'s BOSS search framework.

Delver Communications, the company behind Delver, was founded in 2007 by co-founders Liad Agmon, Avital Yachin and Sagie Davidovitch. Until March 2009, the company was privately held and backed by Carmel Ventures.

=== Acquisition by Sears ===
In March 2009, Sears Holdings Corporation announced that it had purchased Delver.

Delver changed its name to “Sears Holdings Corporation Israel” (S.H.C Israel) and started to work on 2 main projects: Delver.com website, and SPLAT.

=== Delver.com ===
The Delver website re-launched as a social commerce website, empowering the user to find products online using an open platform, with the help of the user’s own network. The website provides the user several abilities: Comment, post reviews and questions on products, create personal catalogs, follow other catalogs, post polls, add purchasable products from other websites, buy products using a shopping cart, and so on.

Delver.com was introduced in Apple's App Store on March 25, 2010.

=== SPLAT ===
A social platform embedded in Sears’ website. This allows many abilities of Delver’s website to be used in Sears’ website, with additional abilities and modifications to suit Sears’ website.

== See also ==
- eCommerce
- Social network service
- Social Search
- Social Networks
