= Enterprise bookmarking =

Enterprise bookmarking is a method for Web 2.0 users to tag, organize, store, and search bookmarks of both web pages on the Internet and data resources stored in a distributed database or fileserver. This is done collectively and collaboratively in a process by which users add tag (metadata) and knowledge tags.

In early versions of the software, these tags are applied as non-hierarchical keywords, or terms assigned by a user to a web page, and are collected in tag clouds. Examples of this software are Connectbeam and Dogear. New versions of the software such as Jumper 2.0 and Knowledge Plaza expand tag metadata in the form of knowledge tags that provide additional information about the data and are applied to structured and semi-structured data and are collected in tag profiles.

== History ==
Enterprise bookmarking is derived from Social bookmarking that got its modern start with the launch of the website del.icio.us in 2003. The first major announcement of an enterprise bookmarking platform was the IBM Dogear project, developed in Summer 2006. Version 1.0 of the Dogear software was announced at Lotusphere 2007, and shipped later that year on June 27 as part of IBM Lotus Connections. The second significant commercial release was Cogenz in September 2007.

Since these early releases, Enterprise bookmarking platforms have diverged considerably. The most significant new release was the Jumper 2.0 platform, with expanded and customizable knowledge tagging fields.

== Differences ==
=== Versus social bookmarking ===
In a social bookmarking system, individuals create personal collections of bookmarks and share their bookmarks with others. These centrally stored collections of Internet resources can be accessed by other users to find useful resources. Often these lists are publicly accessible, so that other people with similar interests can view the links by category or by the tags themselves. Most social bookmarking sites allow users to search for bookmarks which are associated with given "tags", and rank the resources by the number of users which have bookmarked them.

Enterprise bookmarking is a method of tagging and linking any information using an expanded set of tags to capture knowledge about data. It collects and indexes these tags in a web-infrastructure knowledge base server residing behind the firewall. Users can share knowledge tags with specified people or groups, shared only inside specific networks, typically within an organization. Enterprise bookmarking is a knowledge management discipline that embraces Enterprise 2.0 methodologies to capture specific knowledge and information that organizations consider proprietary and are not shared on the public Internet.

=== Tag management ===
Enterprise bookmarking tools also differ from social bookmarking tools in the way that they often face an existing taxonomy. Some of these tools have evolved to provide Tag management which is the combination of uphill abilities (e.g. faceted classification, predefined tags, etc.) and downhill gardening abilities (e.g. tag renaming, moving, merging) to better manage the bottom-up folksonomy generated from user tagging.

== See also ==
- Enterprise search
- Enterprise 2.0
- Social bookmarking
- Knowledge management
- Knowledge tagging
- Web 2.0
- Collaborative intelligence
- Comparison of enterprise bookmarking platforms
- Bookmark manager
- Collaborative tagging
- List of social bookmarking websites
- List of social software
- Semantic Web
- Social networking
- Social software
