= Human search engine =

Search engine using human participation to filter results

A human search engine was a search engine that used human participation to filter the search results and assist users in clarifying their search request. The goal was to provide users with a limited number of relevant results, as opposed to traditional search engines that often return many results that may or may not be relevant.

Examples of defunct human search engines include ApexKB, ChaCha, DMOZ, Mahalo.com, NowNow (from Amazon.com), Sproose, and Webhelp.

== See also ==
- Human-based computation
- Human flesh search engine
- Social search
