= Social search =

Searching on a social searching engine

Social search is a behavior of retrieving and searching on a social searching engine that mainly searches user-generated content such as news, videos and images related search queries on social media like Facebook, LinkedIn, Twitter, Instagram and Flickr. It is an enhanced version of web search that combines traditional algorithms. The idea behind social search is that instead of ranking search results purely based on semantic relevance between a query and the results, a social search system also takes into account social relationships between the results and the searcher. The social relationships could be in various forms. For example, in LinkedIn people search engine, the social relationships include social connections between searcher and each result, whether or not they are in the same industries, work for the same companies, belong the same social groups, and go the same schools, etc.

Social search may not be demonstrably better than algorithm-driven search. In the algorithmic ranking model that search engines used in the past, relevance of a site is determined after analyzing the text and content on the page and link structure of the document. In contrast, search results with social search highlight content that was created or touched by other users who are in the Social Graph of the person conducting a search. It is a personalized search technology with online community filtering to produce highly personalized results. Social search takes many forms, ranging from simple shared bookmarks or tagging of content with descriptive labels to more sophisticated approaches that combine human intelligence with computer algorithms. Depending on the feature-set of a particular search engine, these results may then be saved and added to community search results, further improving the relevance of results for future searches of that keyword. The principle behind social search is that human network oriented results would be more meaningful and relevant for the user, instead of computer algorithms deciding the results for specific queries.

== Research and implementations ==
Over the years, there have been different studies, researches and some implementations of Social Search. In 2008, there were a few startup companies that focused on ranking search results according to one's social graph on social networks. Companies in the social search space include Sproose, Mahalo, Jumper 2.0, Scour, Wink, Eurekster, and Delver. Former efforts include Wikia Search. In 2008, a story on TechCrunch showed Google potentially adding in a voting mechanism to search results similar to Digg's methodology. This suggests growing interest in how social groups can influence and potentially enhance the ability of algorithms to find meaningful data for end users. There are also other services like Sentiment that turn search personal by searching within the users' social circles.

In 2009, a startup project called HeyStaks (www.heystaks.com) developed a web browser plugin "HayStaks". HeyStaks applies social search through collaboration in web search as a way that leads to better search results. The main motivation for HeyStaks to work on this idea is to provide the user with features that search engines didn't provide at that time. For instance, different searches have indicated that about 70% of the time when user search for something, a friend or a coworker have found it already. Also, studies have shown that approximately, 30% of people who use online search, search for something that they have found before. The startup believe that they help avoid these kind of issues by providing a shared and rich search experience through a list of recommendations that get generated based on search results.

In October 2009, Google rolled out its "Social Search"; after a time in beta, the feature was expanded to multiple languages in May 2011. Before the expansion however in 2010 Bing and Google were already taking into account re-tweets and Likes when providing search results. However, after a search deal with Twitter ended without renewal, Google began to retool its Social Search. In January 2012, Google released "Search plus Your World", a further development of Social Search. The feature, which is integrated into Google's regular search as an opt-out feature, pulls references to results from Google+ profiles. The goal was to deliver better, more relevant and personalized search results with this integration. This integration however had some problems in which Google+ still is not wildly adopted or has much usage among many users. Later on, Google was criticized by Twitter for the perceived potential impact of "Search plus Your World" upon web publishers, describing the feature's release to the public as a "bad day for the web", while Google replied that Twitter refused to allow deep search crawling by Google of Twitter's content. By Google integrating Google+, the company was encouraging users to switch to Google's social networking site in order to improve search results. One famous example occurred when Google showed a link to Mark Zuckerberg's dormant Google+ account rather than the active Facebook profile. In November 2014 these accusations started to die down because Google's Knowledge Graph started to finally show links to Facebook, Twitter, and other social media sites.

In December 2008, Twitter had re-introduced their people search feature. While the interface had since changed significantly, it allows you to search either full names or usernames in a straight-forward search engine.

In January 2013, Facebook announced a new search engine called Graph Search still in the beta stages. The goal was to allow users to prioritize results that were popular with their social circle over the general internet. Facebook's Graph search utilized Facebook's user generated content to target users.

Although there have been different researches and studies in social search, social media networks have not vested enough interest in working with search engines. LinkedIn for example has taken steps to improve its own individual search functions in order to stray users from external search engines. Even Microsoft started working with Twitter in order to integrate some tweets into Bing's search results in November 2013. Yet Twitter has its own search engine which points out how much value their data has and why they would like to keep it in house. In the end though social search will never be truly comprehensive of the subjects that matter to people unless users opt to be completely public with their information.

== Social discovery ==
Social discovery is the use of social preferences and personal information to predict what content will be desirable to the user. Technology is used to discover new people and sometimes new experiences shopping, meeting friends or even traveling. The discovery of new people is often in real-time, enabled by mobile apps. However, social discovery is not limited to meeting people in real-time, it also leads to sales and revenue for companies via social media. An example of retail would be the addition of social sharing with music, through the iTunes music store. There is a social component to discovering new music Social discovery is at the basis of Facebook's profitability, generating ad revenue by targeting the ads to users using the social connections to enhance the commercial appeal.

== Social search engines ==
A social search engine in an aspect can be thought of as a search engine that provides an answer for a question from another answer by identifying a person in the answer. That can happen by retrieving a user submitted query and determining that the query is related to the question; and provides an answer, including the link to the resource, as part of search results that are responsive to the query.

Few social search engines depend only on online communities. Depending on the feature-set of a particular search engine, these results may then be saved and added to community search results, further improving the relevance of results for future searches of that keyword. Social search engines are considered a part of Web 2.0 because they use the collective filtering of online communities to elevate particularly interesting or relevant content using tagging. These descriptive tags add to the meta data embedded in Web pages, theoretically improving the results for particular keywords over time. A user will generally see suggested tags for a particular search term, indicating tags that have previously been added.

An implementation of a social search engine is Aardvark. Aardvark is a social search engine that is based on the "village paradigm" which is about connecting the user who has a question with friends or friends of friends whom can answer his or her question. In Aadvark, a user ask a question in different ways that mostly involves online ways such as instant messaging, email, web input or other non-online ways such as text message or voice. The Aardvark algorithm forwards the question to someone in the asker extended social network who has the highest probability in knowing the answer to the question. Aadvark was obtained by Google in 2010 and abandoned later in 2011.

Potential drawbacks to social search lie in its open structure, as is the case with other tagged databases. As these are trust-based networks, unintentional or malicious misuse of tags in this context can lead to imprecise search results. There are number of social search engines that mainly based on tracking user information to order to provide related search results. Examples of this types are Smashfuse, SocialMention, Topsy and Social Searcher, originally linked to Facebook. Other versions of social engines have been launched, including Google Coop, Eurekster, Sproose, Rollyo, Anoox and Yahoo's MyWeb2.0.

== Developments ==
Confirmed to be in testing, a new Facebook app feature called 'Add a Link' lets users see popular articles they might want to include in their status updates and comments by entering a search query. The results appear to comprise articles that have been well-shared by other Facebook users, with the most recently published given priority over others. The option certainly makes it easier for users to add links without manually searching their News Feed or resorting to a Google query. This new app reduce users' reliance on Google Search.

Twitter announced it is replacing its 'Discover' tab with 'Tailored Trends'. The new Tailored Trends feature, besides showing Twitter trends, will give a short description of each topic. Since trends tend to be abbreviations without context, a description will make it more clear what a trend is about. The new trends experience may also include how many Tweets have been sent and whether a topic is trending up or down.

Google may be falling behind in terms of social search, but in reality they see the potential and importance of this technology with Web 3.0 and web semantics. The importance of social media lies within how Semantic search works. Semantic search understands much more, including where you are, the time of day, your past history, and many other factors including social connections, and social signals. The first step in order to achieve this will be to teach algorithms to understand the relationship between things.

However this is not possible unless social media sites decide to work with search engines, which is difficult since everyone would like to be the main toll bridge to the internet. As we continue on, and more articles are referred by social media sites, the main concern becomes what good is a search engine without the data of users.

One development that seeks to redefine search is the combination of distributed search with social search. The goal is a basic search service whose operation is controlled and maintained by the community itself. This would largely work like Peer to Peer networks in which users provide the data they seems appropriate. Since the data used by search engines belongs to the user they should have absolute control over it. The infrastructure required for a search engine is already available in the form of thousands of idle desktops and extensive residential broadband access.

Despite the advantages of distributed search, it shares several same security concerns as the traditionally centralized case. The security concerns can be classified into three categories: data privacy, data integrity and secure social search. Data privacy protection is defined as the way users can fully control their data and manage its accessibility. The solutions for data privacy include information substitution, attributed based encryption and identity based broadcast encryption. The data integrity is defined as the protection of data from unauthorized or improper modifications and deletions. The solutions for data integrity are digital signature, hash chaining and embedded signing key. The solutions for secure social search are blind signature, zero knowledge proof and resource handler.

Another issue related to both distributed and centralized search is how to more accurately understand user intent from observed multimedia data. The solutions are based on how to effectively and efficiently leverage social media and search engine. A potential method is to derive a user-image interest graph from social media, and then re-rank image search results by integrating social relevance from the user-image interest graph and visual relevance from general search engines.

Besides above engineering explorations, a more fundamental and potential method is to develop social search systems based on the understanding of related neural mechanisms. Search problems scale from individuals to societies, however, recent trends across disciplines indicate that the formal properties of these problems share similar structures and, often, similar solutions. Moreover, internal search (e.g., memory search) shows similar characteristics to external search (e.g., spatial foraging), including shared neural mechanisms consistent with a common evolutionary origin across species. For search scenarios, organisms must detect – and climb – noisy, long-range environmental (e.g., temperature, salinity, resource) gradients. Here, social interactions can provide substantial additional benefit by allowing individuals, simply through grouping, to average their imperfect estimates of temporal and spatial cues (the so-called ‘wisdom-of-crowds’ effect). Due to the investment necessary to obtain personal information, however, this again sets the scene for producers (searchers) to be exploited by others.

== See also ==
- Social computing
- Social navigation
- Online community
- Collaborative filtering
- Collaborative information seeking
- Enterprise bookmarking
- Human search engine
- Relevance feedback
- Social information seeking
- Social software
