= Eurekster =

Eurekster was a United States and New Zealand–based company that built social search engines for use on websites, which were referred to as "swickis" (for "search plus wiki"). The company was based in Christchurch and San Francisco, California and had a team of 20 people. It was co-founded by Grant Ryan and Steven Marder, who served as its chief scientist and CEO, respectively. Both also co-founded the Christchurch-based company SLI Systems, which specializes in search engines that learn from users. Ryan also founded YikeBike. According to Marder, "Eurekster pioneered vertical, social search..."

== History ==
Eurekster was founded on 12. December 2003 and launched to the public on 21 January 2004. They declared themselves as a "Search Publisher" and offered custom search bars and search results for websites such as Friendster. By November 2005 they claimed to have 25+ million monthly searches. On November 16, 2005, the Swicki search service officially launched, which allowed anyone to integrate search bars to websites. The service was based on the Yahoo search API, was completely free and was mainly used by blogs. Owners of Websites who uses Swicki were able to white or blacklist search results of websites or just let them search specific topics. (like a gaming blog just let users search for gaming content) By December 2006 40,000 websites used their service, resulting in 21 Million searches in November 2006. By that point new features were implemented, so that users were able to add their own search results to the service, add comments and introduced "write your own result" and "Ask the community for help" buttons. The community was also able to vote for or against results. Also a revenue program named "SwickiADZ" was introduced, which allowed websites to earn money from users via advertisement.

In 2007, Eurekster hosted around 100,000 swickis for various websites, which total approximately 20 million searches per month, or around 800,000 searches per day. In the same year they collected 5.5 million USD in Series B funding. In March 2008 Ryan left Eurekster to concentrate on a - then secret - project.

The companies US division (Eurekster, Inc.) shut down on 3. January 2008 and the New Zealand division (Eurekster Limited) shut down on 6. January 2009.

Today Eurekster Swicki is part of AdMedia.

== Praise ==
In May 2006, Red Herring selected Eurekster as one of their favorite companies that pushed the technological limits in North America.

Eurekster was, on 17 January 2007, announced as one of the 100 best companies by AlwaysOn Media 100. The selection was made by focusing on "innovation, market potential, commercialization, stakeholder value creation, and media attention or 'buzz'".

== Weblinks ==
- A Swicki with a search about "Google" by Phil Bradley - via Archive.org
- Eurekster Website
