= Aardvark (search engine) =

Knowledge market website

- Available in: English
- Owner: Google
- Commercial: Yes
- Launched: Early 2008
- Current status: Abandoned, shut down by Google

Aardvark was a social search service that connected users live with friends or friends-of-friends who were able to answer their questions, also known as a knowledge market. Users submitted questions via the Aardvark website, email or instant messenger and Aardvark identified and facilitated a live chat or email conversation with one or more topic experts in the 'askers' extended social network. Aardvark was used for asking subjective questions for which human judgment or recommendation was desired. It was also used extensively for technical support questions. Users could also review question and answer history and other settings on the Aardvark website. It was named after the sub-Saharan leathery skinned animal Aardvark. Google acquired Aardvark for $50 million on February 11, 2010. In September 2011, Google announced it would discontinue a number of its products, including Aardvark.

== History ==
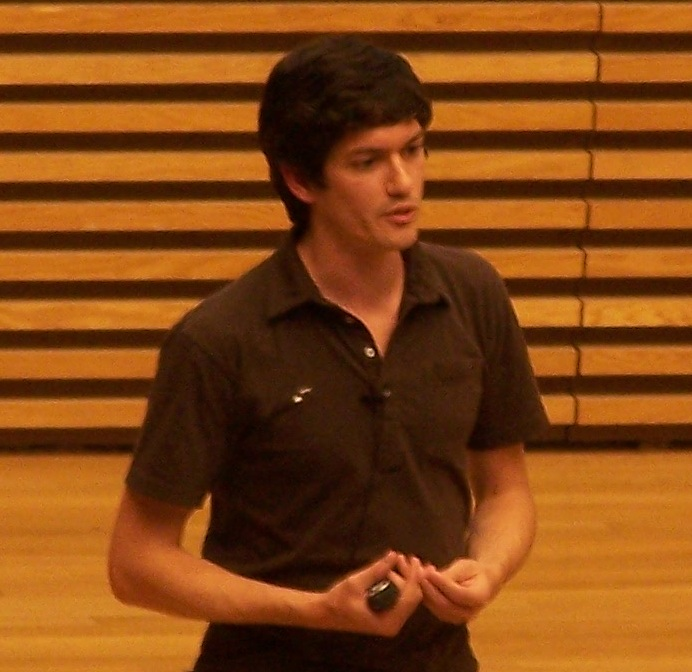
Nathan Stoll giving a presentation to the University of Michigan in October 2010.

Aardvark was originally developed by The Mechanical Zoo, a San Francisco-based startup founded in 2007 by Max Ventilla, Nathan Stoll (both former Google employees), Damon Horowitz and Rob Spiro. A prototype version of Aardvark was launched in early 2008. Aardvark was released to the public in March 2009, although initially new users had to be invited by existing users. The company did not release usage statistics.

The name Mechanical Zoo was chosen in homage to the machine-like aspect of its applications, including Aardvark and other animal-named products that were intended for future release.

== Interaction model ==
When a user joined Aardvark, aardvark was added to the user's IM buddylist. Users submitted questions by email or IM. Aardvark guided the user through the question process by providing messages that confirmed receipt of the question and explained any actions required of the user. IM users were able to use a variety of "IM commands"—one word messages that could be used to fine-tune the question parameters, invite new users, or get help.

There were two main interaction flows available in Aardvark for answering a question. The primary flow involved Aardvark sending a message to the user (via IM, email, etc.) asking if the user would like to answer a question. Periodically, Aardvark contacted users via email or IM when it believed they were well-suited to answer another user's question. Aardvark searched through one's friends and friends' friends also. Instead of sending the question to every friend it found, it searched a person's profile to see if there were information related to the question.

When Aardvark sent a question to the user, if the user responded affirmatively, Aardvark relayed the question as well as the name of the questioner. The user could then simply type an answer to the question, a friend's name or email address to refer to someone who may know the answer or simply type in "pass" to pass on the request. Aardvark sent such requests for answers less than once a day to a given user (and users could easily change contact settings, specify preferred frequency and time of the day for such requests).

Aardvark supported Google Talk, Windows Live Messenger, AOL Instant Messenger and Yahoo! Messenger.

A secondary flow of answering questions was more similar to traditional bulletin-board style interactions: a user sent a message to Aardvark or visited the "Answering" tab of the website, Aardvark showed the user a recent question from the user's network which had not yet been answered and which was related to the user's profile topics. This mode involved the user initiating the exchange when the user was in the mood to try to answer a question; as such, it had the benefit of tapping into users who acted as eager potential 'answerers'.

In all of the interfaces, wrappers around messages from another user included information about the user to facilitate trust: the user's real name, age, gender, the social connection between the two users, a section of topics the user had expertise in, and summary statistics of the user's activity on Aardvark.

== Funding and economic strategies ==
The Mechanical Zoo was privately held, prior to acquisition by Google. Initial funding was in early 2008, with $750,000 in convertible debt from angel investors. This was followed by a series A funding round of $6 million, led by August Capital, in October 2008.

== See also ==
- Human search engine
