= Damon Horowitz =

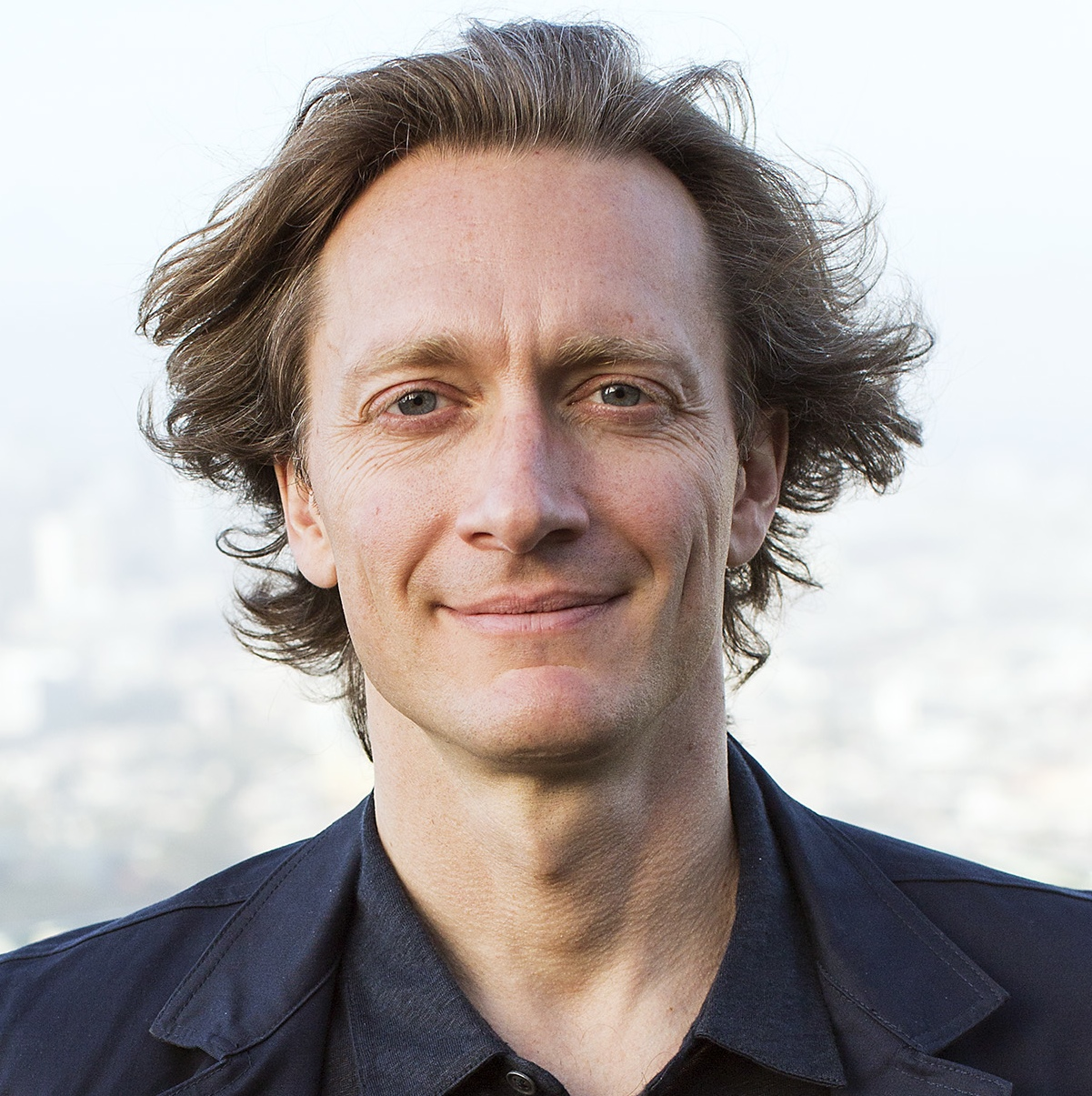
Damon Horowitz in San Francisco in 2016

Damon Horowitz is a philosophy professor, theater maker, and serial entrepreneur. He is best known for his TED talks on teaching philosophy in prison and the ethics of the technology industry, and for his advocacy for the humanities in the technology industry.

Horowitz earned a BA from Columbia University, a MS in Artificial Intelligence from the MIT Media Lab, and a PhD in Philosophy at Stanford University. He began his career in technology, later returning to Stanford to earn a PhD in philosophy.

He was a co-founder of the search engine Aardvark, Perspecta, and Novation Biosciences. He was also In-House Philosopher/Director of Engineering at Google.

Horowitz teaches courses in philosophy, AI, and cognitive science at NYU, Stanford, Columbia, U Penn, and San Quentin State Prison.

Horowitz has served on the Board of Directors of several arts and humanities non-profits, and in 2013 he was elected to the Board of CalHumanities.

In 2014, Horowitz founded the non-profit Shakespeare theater company "The Oracular Theatre", and directed their production of Julius Caesar. In 2026, Horowitz wrote the adaptation for their production of Becoming Hamlet, presented Off-Broadway by The Directors Company, and performed the role of Guide.
