= Open Web Index =

Web index

The Open Web Index (OWI) is an open-sourced search index designed to allow for a nonprofit alternative to the dominant indexes, giving users more choice and agency in searching the web for information.

The OWI project was started in 2014 but the movement towards creating an open index for the web took off in 2018. Promoters offered a similar rationale to that of providing public funding for public media, which is substantial in Europe. The Open Web Index was launched with funding by the European Union in September 2022 as part of the Open Web Search project. It uses free and open source software tools to create its database. A pilot offering of one petabyte of the index was released in June 2025 ahead of Bing's announced retirement of access to its index, with goals of five and ten petabytes on the horizon for the project. A fourteen-member consortium of tech companies, universities, data centers and CERN have helped to fund and build the index. The Open Web Search project officially ended on February 28, 2026, with future efforts to build upon the index being led by the Open Search Foundation and the University of Passau.

The Register called it an effort to foster truly independent search by giving smaller search engines that still utilize Google or Bing for much of their search indexes an alternative index. Search engines that utilize the index would have to meet certain standards on user autonomy, ethical practices and transparency in its rankings. The web crawler, OWLer, respect robots.txt if a site did not want to be indexed. A motivation behind supporting smaller, European-based projects is also that it would be easier to regulate than tech monopolies/oligopolies based outside the EU.

A federated Open Web Index could be one significant step towards for digital sovereignty for its users and for Europe as a whole. Renée Ridgway sees creating this digital public good as an essential alternative to US surveillance capitalism or the techno-authoritarianism of China and Russia. It aims to be transparent in what it does or does not index and enable European technologies in areas like artificial intelligence to be able to build on top of the index.

== See also ==
- Common Crawl
- List of academic databases and search engines
- List of search engine software
- OpenStreetMap
- Startpage
- Wayback Machine
- YaCy
