= Bilingual search engine =

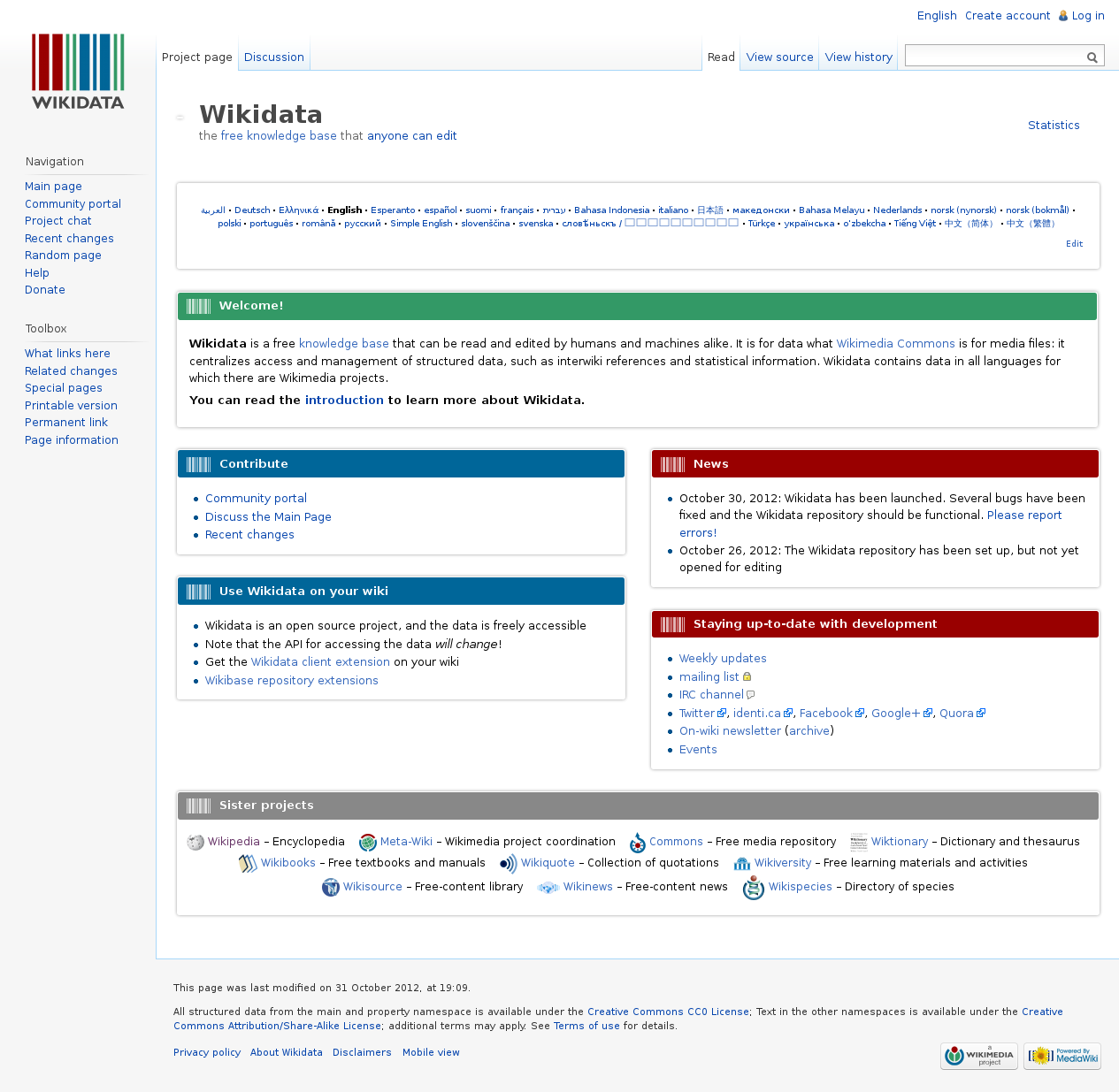
Wikidata is multi-lingual

A bilingual search engine is a search engine that provides multiple language search pages when users type a keyword in one language. This type of search engine gives more detailed information for people who speak more than one language.

Many mainstream search engines provide multiple language services. However, the difference between a bilingual search engine and a multiple language search engine is a bilingual search engine will translate keywords from one language to another automatically.

Some bilingual search engines that have existed include sobotong, Konlap, and Babelplex. The only extant Bilingual search engine might be 2lingual.com.

Google also published a plug-in (Bilingual Search Suggestion) for its Chrome browser to meet the requirement of bilingual search, but it was later discontinued.

== See also ==
- Abstract Wikipedia
