= Aligned Assets =

Software company in the United Kingdom

Aligned Assets Limited
- Company type: Private
- Industry: Software; Gazetteer Solutions; Address Management; Geographic Information Systems (GIS)
- Founded: Guildford, Surrey, (1996)
- Headquarters: Woking, Surrey, UK
- Key people: Andy Hird (Co-Owner & Managing Director), Dinesh Thanigasalam (Co-Owner & Commercial Director)

Aligned Assets was bought out by software company, Idox plc in June 2021. Now operating under the Idox banner, the company continues to develop and deliver address management and gazetteer software local authorities, the emergency services, utilities and the commercial sector. They almost exclusively work with the AddressBase products from the Ordnance Survey.

== History ==
Aligned Assets were formed in 1996 by Carl Nunn, later joined by Phil Gee in 1997 and Mike Saunt in 1998, who all met whilst working together for MapInfo Corporation (now Pitney Bowes MapInfo). Originally working as MapInfo resellers and Geographical Information System (GIS) developers, the company saw early success by securing contracts with companies such as the BBC, Experian and Orange (brand).

Aligned Assets moved into address management with the development in 1997 of the BS7666 Toolbox that was built on behalf of MapInfo to assist UK Local Authorities in the development of the National Land and Property Gazetteer (NLPG).

They currently specialize in the gazetteer and address management market working both in the local government sector and with the emergency services. They are the chosen supplier to the British Transport Police, Transport for London, Birmingham City Council and were involved in the FiReControl project.

After the introduction of BS7666:2006, they were the first company to achieve accreditation to the new standard and the first company to have one of their customers fully migrated.

The start of 2010 saw the company move into the commercial sector after they became the UK's first reseller of NLPG data. In 2011, they were announced as the first UK company to be able to provide products compatible with the NLPG's replacement - AddressBase. In February 2017 Andy Hird and Dinesh Thanigasalam were announced as the new majority shareholders of Aligned Assets following a successful Management Buyout.

In June 2021, Aligned Assets was acquired by software giant, Idox plc. The company continues to deliver the market leading, feature-rich Gazetteer Management Systems for local authorities and emergency services; and address management systems for utilities and other commercial organisations.

== Operations ==
Idox (previously Aligned Assets) provides addressing software and consultancy to various market sectors across the UK. The services provided typically focus around Address Management solutions to the following markets:

- Local government
- The Emergency services
- Utilities
- Telecommunications
- Insurance

Some projects undertaken by the company include:

- London Fire Brigade - Adopting Idox's Bluelight Gazetteer Management System as an alternative to Esri's LocatorHub.
- Cherwell District Council - Maximising efficiency through a Council-wide cloud-first strategy.
- Adur & Worthing Borough Councils - Councils win four Gold Standard address and street data GeoPlace Exemplar Awards.
- Scottish Fire & Rescue Service - Creating easily identifiable sections of Scotland's rapid transit routes to drive quicker deployment of fire crews.
- Avon and Somerset Police - Accurate addresses: defining location for increased efficiency.
