= YikeBike =

Folding electric bicycle

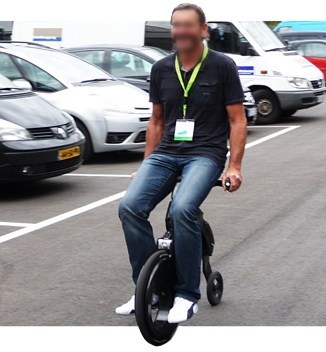
YikeBike with rider.

The YikeBike is a folding E-Bike announced at Eurobike 2009 that went into production in mid 2010. The YikeBike was invented by Grant Ryan, one of the founders of Eurekster and designed by a team in New Zealand over 5 years. It was sold in over 40 countries. Up to December 2019, 2000 YikeBikes were sold.

The bike when folded, it is small enough to fit in a carry bag, so it can be transported in an urban bus.

== History ==
The development of the YikeBike started in 2004 and was partly funded by the New Zealand Ministry of Science and Innovation. In September 2009, the YikeBike was presented to the public at Eurobike in Germany by Project Garlic Ltd., shortly after YikeBike was ranked 15th on Time magazine's 50 Best Inventions of 2009 list. The bike was compared to the Segway, by the international press. In 2010, the bike was awarded a Guinness World Record for the "most compact electric bike" at the time. 2011 saw the release of a carbon version with a price of approximately $3,800, and an aluminum version named "Fusion" with a price of approximately $2,000. By May 2011, 250 carbon YikeBikes had been sold. In 2013, a third version called "Synergy" was released.

YikeBike featured on Discovery Channel's Daily Planet show. Stephen Fry tested the YikeBike in season 1, episode 1 of Stephen Fry's 100 Greatest Gadgets. In 2017 YikeBike presented an electric skateboard, with up to 30 km/h (or 24 km/h) that would be funded via Kickstarter but failed their goal. As of December 2019, YikeBike had manufactured around 2000 units. The owners of YikeBike began publicly seeking a merger and acquisition in 2019. As of July 2026, none has been announced.

== The Bike ==
The YikeBike looks like a mini version of a penny-farthing. It has a maximum Speed of 23 km/h (14mp/h) folds to 15x60x60cm (6x23.6x23.6 in) and weighs 11 to 14 kg (24.7 to 30.9 lb). The vehicle has no chain, pedals, gear box, mechanical brake, cables or levers. These functions are provided by a 0.2 kW (0.27 hp) electric motor and controller. The bike has regenerative electronic anti-skid brakes. The tires are 20" (20x1.35) on the front and 8" (8x1¼) on the back. There are also built-in lights, indicators and horn for safety. One charge has a reach of 6 miles (9,7 km)

== Legality ==
In Europe the YikeBike would not be classified as a bicycle but as an E-Scooter in some countries. In some countries like Germany or the UK the YikeBike would not be legal to drive on public roads. In New Zealand the YikeBike got declared as a non motor vehicle in 2014.

== Awards ==
- 2010: Supreme Award for Product Design
- 2010: Gold Award for Consumer Product
- 2010: International Design Award “Urban Sustainable Design” category
- 2011: iF product design award
- 2013: Champion Canterbury award

== See also ==
- Electric motorcycles

== Weblinks ==
- Official Website
