= Zettair =

Zettair is a compact text search engine for indexing and search of HTML (or TREC) collections. It is an open source software developed by a group of researchers at RMIT University.

Its primary feature is the ability to handle large document collections (100 GB and more). It has a single executable, which performs both on-the-fly indexing and searching, with a command-line interface.

It is licensed under the terms of the GPL license.

== See also ==
- Information retrieval (IR)
- Zetta

== Bibliography ==
- RMIT University at TREC 2004 (pdf) - B. Billerbeck, A. Cannane, A. Chattaraj, N. Lester, W. Webber, H. E. Williams, J. Yiannis, J. Zobel - 2005 - RMIT University
- Enhancing Content-And-Structure Information Retrieval using a Native XML Database (presentation) - J. Pehcevski (RMIT), J. A. Thom (RMIT), A.-M. Vercoustre (INRIA) - 2005 - Cornell University Library
