= StrangeSearch =

- Developer(s): Jeremy Davis, Dan Dunham
- Operating system: Windows
- Type: Search engine
- License: GNU General Public License
- Website: www.strangesearch.net

StrangeSearch is a free, open-source indexing and search engine for Windows by Jeremy Davis and Dan Dunham. It was originally developed at Iowa State University and is the inspiration for several search engines.

StrangeSearch is written in C#, C++ and Perl. It has a native Windows user interface for administration and is accessed through a web browser for searching. StrangeSearch is licensed under the terms of the GNU General Public License.

This project is no longer actively maintained.

== Features ==
StrangeSearch has the ability to index the files shared by a large number of computers on a network via FTP or SMB (Windows file sharing). It also has a basic web interface pre-built in Perl to allow for searching and ranking of the top shares.

== Projects inspired by StrangeSearch ==
Many of these projects use the same StrangeSearch code, but some use(d) their own software.

- Weirdsearch (Reimplementation in straight C by a bored coder- much faster.)
- Pantssearch (Used StrangeSearch code with several UI enhancements.)
- landex (Arguably better than StrangeSearch in terms of features; uses its own code.)
- fseek
- Seek42 (Linux-based, developed at the University of Missouri–Rolla, also available on SourceForge. Now maintained by one of the authors of the now defunct Seekant.)
