= Text Engine =

Search engine

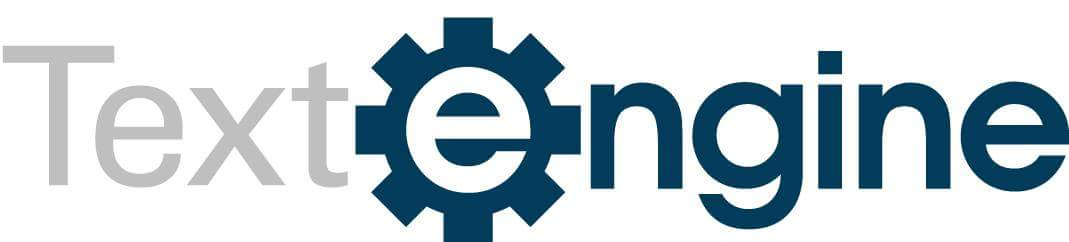
- Founded: May 9, 2013
- Founders: Eric Bryant & Shari Sloane
- Defunct: October 31, 2018
- Headquarters: Bedminster, New Jersey, United States
- Area served: Global
- Services: Web search, mobile search
- Website: https://textengine.info

Text Engine was a browser-less search engine based on text messages. Users could access basic internet information, without a data plan or a Wi-Fi connection, by sending and receiving text messages. It also employed human operators to answer queries when the application was unable to retrieve correct results. The company, founded in 2013 by Eric Bryant and Shari Sloane, was based in Bedminster, New Jersey, USA, part of the New York metropolitan area. Service in the US was discontinued in October 2018.

== History ==
The alpha version of Text Engine was launched on May 9, 2013 in a Google Product Forum in which Google announced that it sunset a similar service. The alpha version was simply called “Google SMS Search” and only allowed 15 free queries per month. After that quota was reached, users were charged a $4 fee to continue using the search engine.

By June 2013, the product was released in beta and was launched as “smir.ch”. At this time the company introduced new search commands and made improvements including adding news search and simplifying weather search.

By March 2015, the company had changed the name to “Text Engine” and opened the service up to users for free. New York educator, Lisa Nielsen, called Text Engine “great news for educators and students in low-income and rural communities”. Information Text Engine retrieved included news, definitions, Wikipedia articles, business listings, driving directions and flight status.

In June 2015, popular tech blog, MakeUseOf, reported that “Text Engine is an attempt to bring back the spirit of Google’s SMS search, and it’s a fairly ambitious one at that.” Text Engine did not require a downloadable app, web browser or internet access to function, making the Web accessible for feature phone and flip phone users.

The company’s mission was to connect the offline world to the Internet by creating smartphones in regions that don’t have them. Text Engine had users in countries around the world, including Botswana, Uganda, Namibia, Nigeria, the Philippines, Australia, Mongolia and Pakistan. In August 2015, Startup Daily reported that Text Engine had begun licensing its codebase to developers in emerging markets. For example, the Almat Group, a Brooklyn real estate development company, licensed the code to build a local version for Nigeria.

Along with 132 other tri-state area startups, Text Engine was awarded the distinction of “Tech Company to Watch” by the Connecticut Technology Council in 2015. It was also selected along with 21 other startups as a member of the reSET Impact Accelerator’s 2016 cohort.

Innovation Destination Hartford reported in February 2016 that Text Engine had received “significant financial investment from Backstage Capital”, a venture capital fund in Los Angeles. However, the exact amount was undisclosed.

In 2018, Text Engine was purchased by Cisco, which decided to shut down Text Engine due to low revenue. Text Engine discontinued service in the US in October 2018. It is unclear whether Text Engine will sell its code base to other developers.

== Products ==
=== Browser-less web search ===
Text Engine was essentially a search engine that worked without the need for a web browser. The platform essentially converted the Web to text messages, allowing users to get on-demand weather, news, yellow pages, flight status, and more—all without having direct access to the Internet.

=== Human Operators ===
In addition to the automated search, Text Engine also provided a way for users to place orders and answer questions through the help of human operators.
