= Yebol =

Defunct search engine

- Website type: Search engine
- Creators: Hongfeng Yin, PhD
- Website: www.yebol.com
- Commercial: Yes
- Registration: Optional
- Launched: July 27, 2009; 17 years ago (Beta launch)
- Current status: Defunct

Yebol was a vertical "decision" search engine that had developed a knowledge-based, semantic search platform. Based in San Jose, California, Yebol's artificial intelligence human intelligence-infused algorithms automatically cluster and categorize search results, web sites, pages and contents that it presents in a visually indexed format that is more aligned with initial human intent. Yebol used association, ranking and clustering algorithms to analyze related keywords or web pages. Yebol presented as one of its goals the creation of a unique "homepage look" for every possible search term.

== Features ==
Yebol aimed for absolute relevance and eliminating the need for refined, secondary, or advanced search steps, as currently required by Google and Bing. Yebol sees the Future of Search as being very different than today's current Pay-Per-Click dominated structure. Its public beta version launched July 27, 2009, at which time Yebol announced that it covers in excess of 10 million search terms with its current knowledge-based search/organized results format. In fact, Yebol says its main distinction is its verticality (versus the horizontal search nature of today's major index engines). Like all engines, Yebol used "a recursive procedure in which an automatic problem solver seeks a solution by iteratively exploring sequences of possible alternatives." The website shows the domain name as having expired March 4, 2011, but as of March 17 the expiration date has been renewed to 2013.

Yebol estimated it will cover, by early Q1 2010, all existing permutable search terms in its intelligent search results format. Its strategy involves incorporating internet meme theory and Optimization (mathematics) to drive and attract new users. Yebol integrates natural language processing, metasynthetic-engineered open complex systems, and machine algorithms with human knowledge for each query to establish a web directory that actually 'learns,' using correlation, clustering and classification algorithms to automatically generate the knowledge query, which is retained and regenerated forward.

== Technology ==
The Yebol Beta logo used until 2010

Yebol's technology format incorporated aspects of automated results generation web search engines, such as Google, with those of metasearch and other human-authored results search engines. Yebol was designed to utilize a combination of patented meta elements and search algorithms paired with human-based computation to build a Web directory for each web search query. Yebol had focused on developing a list of algorithms of association, clustering and categorization for automatically generating knowledge for question answering, latent semantic analysis web sites, web pages and users.

Yebol also integrated human labeled information into its multilayer perceptron and information retrieval algorithms. This technology allows for a multi-dimensional search results format: best-first search and higher – summary of top sites and categories for queries; wider – related search terms; longer – results of expansion terms for the queries; deeper – inside links and keywords of search result pages. Instead of a multi-page, selection-based search results format, Yebol provided a categorized structure of results on one screen, aimed at creating a "homepage" for any given topic, which is attuned to an advanced hybrid version of bayesian search theory and collaboration graph theory. The totality of a topic will ideally be embedded there fully in such a "homepage" search return, thus making that page an authoritative summation source in itself.
