= SinglePoint =

SinglePoint is a piece of address management software from Aligned Assets. Its primary function is to act as a search engine that allows the user to search a central address database by entering search terms.

== Product History ==
SinglePoint was originally designed and built for the British Transport Police (BTP) when they commissioned bespoke development work from Aligned Assets in 2007. They required a product that was capable of searching the National Land and Property Gazetteer (NLPG), their names database and their internal gazetteer, and from this requirement was born SinglePoint.

The original BTP design was then productised and made available to other market sectors including local government, other emergency services and the commercial sector.

== How it works ==
SinglePoint works by loading the chosen data into its schema, which it then indexes in a method similar to internet search engines. This process is repeated for each database, which are loaded into separate schemas allowing for their separate, as well as simultaneous searching.

It can be accessed via a web browser or can utilise web services when embedded into other applications.

== Use in the Emergency Services ==
SinglePoint forms the main component in Symphony Bluelight Search, which is Aligned Assets’ address search engine for the emergency services. Because there continues to be no definitive choice of address data amongst the UK’s emergency services with some using the NLPG and others the products from the Ordnance Survey, SinglePoint has been adapted to allow for the searching of both. This adapter technology is what allows it to search multiple data sources and makes it customisable to the users requirements.

== Current Uses ==
SinglePoint is now a well-established product in the field of address management and competes directly with products such as Experian’s QAS Pro. Examples of its use include as part of the NEAT box office ticketing system at Worthing Borough Council and the UK-wide Planning Portal

== See also ==
Aligned Assets
