= Yandex Data Factory =

Yandex Data Factory (YDF) was a B2B division of Yandex, the leading Russian search engine and one of the largest European internet companies.

== Description ==
YDF used artificial intelligence and machine learning technologies to increase productivity, reduce costs, and improve energy efficiency in process manufacturing.

== Notable clients ==
Among their clients and partners were Intel, AstraZeneca, CERN openlab, Magnitogorsk Iron and Steel Works, Gazprom Neft, and Schlumberger.

== Restructuring and Legacy ==
Following the corporate restructuring of Yandex in July 2024, the "Yandex Data Factory" brand was discontinued. The company's international assets were reorganized under the Nebius Group, an Amsterdam-based AI infrastructure company led by Arkady Volozh, which focuses on cloud computing and autonomous driving rather than industrial B2B consulting. The division's Russian operations and industrial client contracts were integrated into the domestic Yandex Cloud and Yandex B2B Tech services.
