= Thunderstone Software =

American document search software company

Thunderstone Software LLC
- Type: Private company
- Industry: Information Technology
- Founded: 1981
- Headquarters: Cleveland, United States
- Website: www.thunderstone.com

Thunderstone Software LLC is a US-based software company headquartered in Cleveland, Ohio, specialising in enterprise search technology. Founded in 1981, it is one of the longer-established companies in the enterprise search market, and was among the early entrants in the search appliance segment. The company offers enterprise search software and appliances for organisations that need to index and query large document collections across internal systems.
