= Intelligent medical search engine =

An intelligent medical search engine is a vertical search engine that uses expert system technology to provide personalized medical information.

== Description ==
Searching for medical information on the Web is a challenging task for ordinary Internet users. Often, users are uncertain about their exact medical situations, are unfamiliar with medical terminology, and hence have difficulty in coming up with the right search keywords. An intelligent medical search engine is specifically designed to address this challenge. It uses several techniques to improve its usability and search result quality. First, it uses an interactive questionnaire-based query interface to guide users to provide the most important information about their situations. Users perform search by selecting symptoms and answering questions rather than by typing keyword queries. Second, it uses medical knowledge (e.g., diagnostic decision trees) to automatically form multiple queries from a user' answers to the questions. These queries are used to perform search simultaneously. Third, it provides various kinds of help functions.

== See also ==
- Medical literature retrieval
