= Open Search Foundation =

European digital rights nonprofit

The Open Search Foundation (OSF) is a European nonprofit organization promoting internet freedom.

In 2019, the Open Search Foundation published a report advocating for open search infrastructure. In 2020, the newly-formed group was advocating for the creation of a common index to underpin European search engines. OSF became a lead organizer of the Open Web Index, an open-sourced search index designed to allow for a nonprofit alternative to the dominant indexes, giving users more choice and agency in searching the web for information. The foundation has organized sessions about the values that should be part of the web index as well as a working group to investigate the legal challenges that would need to be addressed.

== See also ==
- European Digital Rights
- Internet Archive
- OpenStreetMap Foundation
