= Intergator =

Information Access Platform

intergator
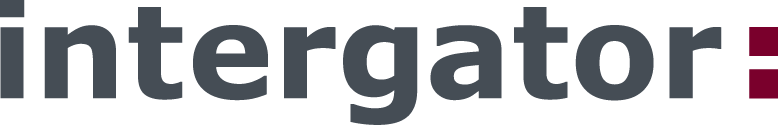
- Developer: interface projects GmbH
- Stable release: intergator 5.5 (March 2018)
- Written in: Java, Groovy and XML/JSON
- Operating system: Linux, Microsoft Windows
- Type: Enterprise Search, Information Management, Business Applications, Knowledge Management, Semantic Search, Social Intranet, Compliance
- License: Commercial, test version available for download, also offered as appliance hardware
- Website: www.intergator.de

Intergator is an Information Access Platform and a product suite for Enterprise Search. It is a search engine designed for organizations' internal systems, knowledge management and analytics platforms. The newest iteration of the product focuses on Enterprise Search, Big Content Analytics, Knowledge Capturing, and Social Intranet. It is developed by interface projects GmbH, a subsidiary of the interface business group, with its head office in Dresden, Sachsen.

== Development ==
In 2003 the first version of Intergator was introduced into the IT market. The key functions were built on the program `TextDog`, which had been developed by Kristian Hermsdorf in the context of his diploma thesis in 2000. He wrote his thesis about the automated classification of documents with neural networks. The thesis became the starting point for the Enterprise Search Solution "Intergator".

The software was developed for the quick location of relevant information within an enterprise network (Enterprise Search).

With the help of connectors, Intergator enables comprehensive indexing of more than 550 file formats. It is written in Java and utilizes the Lucene library.

It contains modules that are intended to improve its scalability and performance. Intergator runs after installation on every web browser. A high degree of customization is achieved with the adaptable Social Dashboard.

== Features ==
=== Social Dashboard ===
The Intergator Social Dashboard is an individual unique tailor-made interface capturing all sources of information needed. No need to always start a new search. Search queries are automatically saved. Intergator retrieves proactively and permanently new information related to search queries. Fundamental to the Intergator Social Dashboard is a search conducted through various systems. Results of configurable search requests will be shown in free placeable apps on the dashboard.

=== Documentation Reader ===
Locate text within large documents quickly with visual highlighting, straight from the browser and without additional plug-in installations.

=== Analytics ===
Analytics offers extensive analysis and statistical functions about search behavior and document access. Data quality can be improved by detecting duplicates.

=== Thumbnail previews and knowledge network ===
The usability and flexibility in displaying search results and hit details is supported by dynamically rendered templates. So it is possible to show various attributes, like metadata of search results, as well as links to continued information on similar or connected documents.

=== Facets ===
Facets have become standard in modern enterprise search solutions. Their main use can be seen in filtering search results by considering the peculiarity of values of important hit attributes. Facets can be defined at every moment and are available without reindexing while business goes on. In many cases the user will not find documents, but the specification of particular metadata is the answer on a query. Therefore, facets are presented as results and not real search results.

=== OCR-Service ===
OCR is a text recognition module. Text is acquired from scanned documents or images in PDF files – essential for full–text searches and automatic metadata extraction.

=== Navigator ===
The Navigator is an alternative to a standard search interface. Search results are visualized with a hypertree and a tabular view, which is particularly suitable for an exploratory search.

=== Mobile Search ===
For mobile accessing of all enterprise information (list of employees, business contacts, documentations etc.) a special web interface is available.

=== Connectors ===
Connectors are the connection between Intergator and the data sources. All connectors are in-house developments of interface projects GmbH. Standard connectors are free of charge.

=== Management Center ===
The Management Center is responsible for administration and monitoring the Intergator server status.

=== Additional features ===
- Combination between favorites and tags leads to individualization within the application
- Facets serves as restriction for search terms and can be redefined every time
- Dynamic grouping of search results leads to prioritization of parts of the result
- Recognizing scanned text (OCR) for opening additional content and generation of metadata with help of text-identification service

=== Fields of application ===
- Enterprise Search
- Social Intranet Solution
- Knowledge Management
- Content analysis of structured and unstructured data
- Search Based Applications (e.g. Business Applications/Business intelligence)
- Website search
- IT driven Knowledge Management for ISO 9001:2015
- Digital Workplace

== Strategic partnerships ==
- Since 2008 PPS Pre Press System GmbH from Oberusel/Taunes integrated Intergator since 2008 as intelligent search in the digitized archives.
- Since July 2011, the company cooperates with aexea GmbH from Stuttgart to collect knowledge together. With the joint product `analygator`, they can develop strategic knowledge about competitors.
- The partnership with the Austrian company ITdesign Software Projects & Consulting GmbH in March 2014, marked the beginning of the spread of Intergator beyond the German borders.
- In December 2014, interface projects GmbH started the partnership with the company ACIS Information Technology from Dubai (UAE). ACIS represents the central distribution point for the knowledge management and analytics platform Intergator in the Middle East.
- Since May 2015, the edoc solutions ag from Weilerswist is a new sales and solution partner of interface projects GmbH. Edoc solutions GmbH is a specialist in the field of Enterprise Content Management (ECM).
- Since July 2015 cadonau consulting gmbh from Switzerland has become a sales and solution partner of interface projects GmbH. With cadonau consulting one of the leading IT consulting firms in the Swiss market has partnered up with interface to support Swiss companies in recognizing the potential of enterprise search for their business processes and to accompany the entire process from setting the strategic framework to technical implementation.
- Since August 2016 interface projects GmbH has established a representative office in Austria.

== Awards ==
Intergator Enterprise Search has been awarded by "Initiative Mittelstand" in the category `Reporting` as category-winner. In the year 2008 interface projects GmbH received an award in the category knowledge management for Intergator. 2009 Intergator reached the round of nominated in the category Landessieger Saxony.
