= Elium =

- Developer: Whatever SA
- Release: 2009; 17 years ago
- Available in: English, French, German, Dutch
- Type: Web application
- Website: elium.com

Elium is a European knowledge management software platform delivered as Software as a Service (SaaS) for enterprises. Founded in 2007 and originally named Knowledge Plaza, the company rebranded as Elium in March 2017. Its headquarters are in Louvain-la-Neuve, Belgium.

The platform provides a knowledge infrastructure designed to capture, structure and maintain enterprise knowledge, serving both end users and AI agents. It supports use cases including company-wide knowledge bases, customer service, IT technical support, market intelligence, employee onboarding, wikis and knowledge sharing across distributed teams. Customers include BCG, BNP Paribas, Bouygues, Council of Europe, Fnac Darty, L'Oréal, SNCF and VINCI Energies.

In the 2026 edition of the annual benchmark carried out by French consultancy firm Lecko, which evaluates 20 digital workplace platforms across 36 use cases and six functional families, Elium is described as a "reference European SaaS provider for enterprise knowledge management". Lecko highlights its "knowledge-as-code" approach, treating enterprise knowledge as a versioned and governed asset, and its increased adoption as a "source of truth" for corporate AI services.

In September 2013, the company announced the acquisition of Swiss social publishing company Hyperweek. In August 2017, Elium closed a Series A funding round of €4 million led by Serena Capital in collaboration with S.R.I.W. In May 2022, the company obtained ISO/IEC 27001 certification for information security management.

== Awards ==
- In May 2011, Elium received the "Belgian Start-up of the year" Award from Belgian's leading ICT Magazine Datanews.
- In October 2010, Elium was nominated KMWorld Promise Award 2010 finalist.
- In June 2010, Elium won the prize for the most innovative knowledge management tool at KM Forum conference in Paris.
- In 2008, Elium won the Prix Lionel Van den Bossche 2008 award given each year to a Belgian innovative enterprise.

== Software overview ==
As a knowledge management software platform, the main features of Elium are the following:

- Knowledge lifecycle management: content creation, document management, collaborative wikis, governance and freshness tracking
- Full-text social search with faceted navigation and built-in retrieval-augmented generation (RAG)
- AI-powered question-answering, content generation and connectivity to external AI systems via MCP
- Tag management combining company-defined taxonomy and user-generated folksonomy
- Role-based permissions, content sharing and automated email distribution
- Analytics and reporting at multiple levels
- Third-party integrations (Slack, Microsoft Teams, SharePoint, Google Workspace, Power BI, Zendesk, GLPI, Jira)
- Security features including two-factor authentication, audit logging and European data hosting
- Mobile access, REST API and data export

== Specific features ==
The following table summarises the platform's main functional areas.

Features	Characteristics
Content creation	Rich-text block editor with drag-and-drop (text, images, files, tables, code, embeds, galleries, to-do lists, decision trees). Collaborative content creation (wikis), drafts, versioning, article templates and file import.
Content creation	Similar content detection to prevent duplication and automatic estimated read time display.
Knowledge organisation	Workspaces called "spaces" (public, moderated, private, secret), tabs, groups of spaces, categories and tags with multilingual taxonomy management.
Knowledge organisation	Tag management combines a company-defined taxonomy with user-generated folksonomy.
Search	Combined full-text social search and faceted navigation. Advanced search with Boolean logic, filters and a relevance-ranking algorithm.
Artificial intelligence	Built-in retrieval-augmented generation (RAG): the "Answer" feature semantically indexes knowledge base content, retrieves the most relevant paragraphs and generates cited responses using AI. Responses are scoped to the querying user's access permissions. Available via the web interface, Slack and Microsoft Teams.
Artificial intelligence	In-editor AI writing assistance ("Smart Editor"), automatic summarisation and contextual Smart Assistants.
Artificial intelligence	Connectivity to external AI systems via MCP connector, with documented integrations for ChatGPT and Claude. Support for integration into enterprise RAG pipelines. AI feedback management for administrators.
Knowledge lifecycle management	Approval workflows, article ownership and transfer, expiration dates with automated review notifications, content freshness tracking, duplicate and similar-content detection, annotations, protected articles and content requests.
Permissions	Role-based access control at platform and space level. Four space visibility types. Per-article visibility overrides and user affiliation management.
Sharing and distribution	Bookmarklet for adding and sharing web content. Email broadcast, public web links, contributor invitations, resharing and homepage promotion.
Sharing and distribution	Email pipelines for organising emails and their attachments.
Notifications	Custom email digests and alerts (personal and shared), email pipelines and urgent notifications.
Analytics	Dashboards at platform, space, article-owner and individual-article level. End-of-year analytics reports.
Integrations	Slack, Microsoft Teams, SharePoint (federated search), Microsoft Office (in-app editing), Power BI, Google Analytics. Browser extension for Chrome and Microsoft Edge with Smart Assistant support for Zendesk, Intercom, Jira and GLPI.
API	REST API with public documentation for custom integrations.
Security	ISO/IEC 27001 certified. Two-factor authentication, biometric authentication, antivirus scanning, audit log. Multi-infrastructure hosting on European servers, with SecNumCloud-qualified infrastructure (Dassault Systèmes Outscale) available as an option.
Mobile	Native mobile app (iOS/Android), custom-branded app option and progressive web app (PWA).
Export	Full export and summary of information packages. Export of article metadata and full platform content download.
Customisation	Configurable homepage, app launcher, smart feeds and look-and-feel theming.
Multilingual support	Automatic article translation, manual translation and multilingual tags and categories.
