= Google Search Appliance =

Computer device used for document indexing

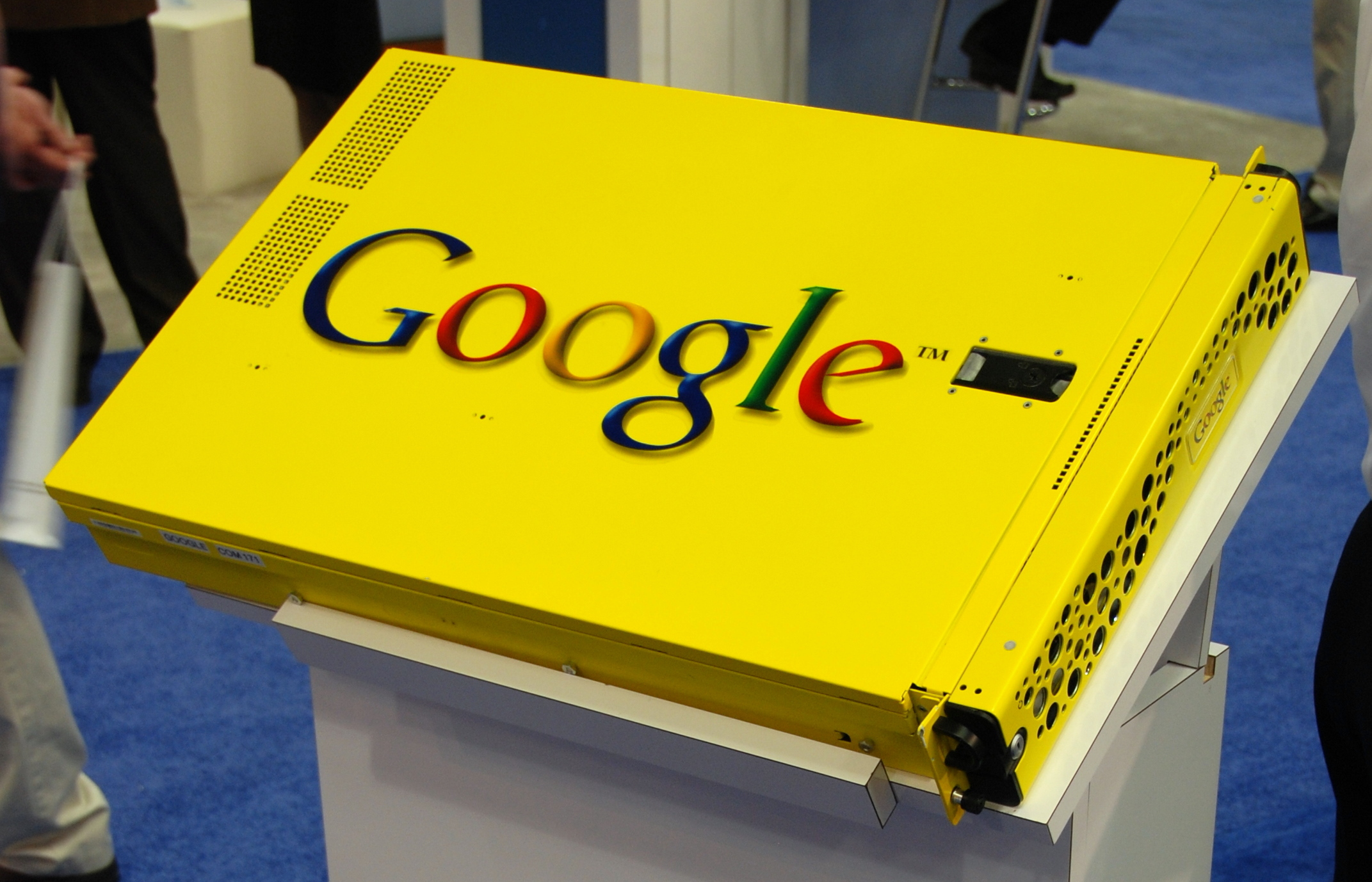
- Developer: Google
- Released: 2002
- Operating system: CentOS
- Website: google.com/enterprise/search at the Wayback Machine (archived 2011-09-11)

The Google Search Appliance (GSA) is a discontinued series of rack-mounted servers with search engine indexing software.

The GSA operating system was based on CentOS. The software was produced by Google and the hardware was manufactured by Dell. The final 2009 GSA version was based on Dell's PowerEdge R710. Google announced the phase out of the GSA in early 2016 and a complete discontinuation by 2019.

The GSA was supplied in two models: a 2U model (GB-7007) capable of indexing up to 10 million documents, and a 5U (2U plus 3U storage) model (GB-9009) that was capable of indexing up to 30 million documents. Sales were operated on a licensing scheme which started as a two-year contract for maintenance, support and software updates.

== Features ==
The GSA contained Google search technologies and a means of configuring and customizing the appliance.

== Versions ==
The GSA was first introduced in 2002.

Software version 6.0 was released in June, 2009. This software ran on some hardware versions of the GB-1001 model (all units with an "S5" prefix in their "Appliance ID"), and all GB-7007 and GB-9009 models.

Google released version 7.0 on October 9, 2012, and version 7.2 on February 11, 2014. These were followed by version 7.4 in March 2015, and ultimately the final software release, version 7.6, before the product line was completely discontinued.

== Models ==
The GSA could be purchased in two separate versions based on the number of documents being indexed. Model G100, a 2U appliance, could index up to 20,000,000 documents. The G500 5U appliance could index up to 100,000,000 documents.

== Other versions ==
=== Older appliances ===
Google sold a 2U appliance (GB-1001) capable of indexing up to 5 million documents, a half-rack cluster (GB-5005) of five 2U nodes capable of indexing up to 10 million documents, and a full-rack cluster (GB-8008) of eight―and later 12 nodes―capable of indexing up to 30 million documents. Some models were based on Dell PowerEdge 2950 2U rack mounted servers.

=== Google Mini ===
The Google "Blue" Mini was a smaller and lower-cost search solution that occupied 1U of rack space for small and medium-sized businesses to set up an Internet search engine that allowed them to index and search up to 300,000 documents. The hardware was manufactured by Gigabyte Technology then Super Micro Computer, Inc. Manufacture and sale of the Google Mini were discontinued beginning in July 31, 2012.

=== GSA virtual edition for developers ===
For a brief period in 2008, Google offered a virtual version of the GSA aimed at developers. The virtual edition could be downloaded free of charge and index up to 50,000 documents. It was discontinued for unknown reasons.

== Retirement and shutdown ==
Early in February 2016, Google sent a confidential letter to its business partners and customers, stating that the GSA would not be available past 2018. It began with the discontinuation of GSA three-year contracts in 2016; in 2017 there would be only one-year renewal contracts and no hardware sales, followed by a complete shutdown in 2018. Customers were expected to migrate to a cloud-based solution.
