= OpenSearchServer =

- Developer: Emmanuel Keller
- Release: June 8, 2008; 18 years ago
- Stable release: v1.5.14 / August 9, 2016; 10 years ago
- Written in: Java, C/C++, PHP
- Available in: English
- Type: Search engine
- License: GNU General Public License 3
- Website: open-search-server.com

OpenSearchServer is an open-source application server allowing development of index-based applications such as search engines. Available since April 2009 on SourceForge for download, OpenSearchServer was developed under the GPL v3 license and offers a series of full text lexical analyzers. It can be installed on different platforms (Windows, Linux, Macintosh).

While it started as an in-house project by a private media group, OpenSearchServer is now supported by Jaeksoft, a commercial company launched in February 2010. Jaeksoft provides services and roadmap guidance for OpenSearchServer.

The main features of OpenSearchServer are : An integrated crawler for databases, web pages and rich documents; a user-friendly GUI allowing development of most applications through a web page interface built in Zkoss; snippets; faceting; an HTML renderer for integrating search results in a page; and monitoring and administration features.

OpenSearchServer is written in Java and it can be integrated into almost any kind of application without the need to produce Java code. REST/XML APIs make OpenSearchServer connectable to other programming languages. The "advanced plugins" capability allows sophisticated customizations.

OpenSearchServer is currently available in version 1.2.3 rc2, and it is considered stable by the developers' community. Version 1.1, launched in April 2009, reached the SourceForge top 15, with wide press coverage, and many new users worldwide.

== History ==
The OpenSearchServer project began in 2007 in Infopro Group, a French B2B media group made up of 15 subsidiaries with online and offline activities in news and information brokerage. Since no existing search solution offered the appropriate mix of features, price and ease of use, it was decided to create new software using available open source components. The three objectives of the project were: a versatile feature set addressing the needs of all subsidiaries; easy access to the features via a user-friendly interface; and a comprehensive solution with a crawler, an indexer and a query interpreter. The project leader was Emmanuel Keller, CIO, leading a large team of engineers among whom 3 were dedicated to the project. In 2008, the first application was launched and soon after about 10 others followed.

In December 2009, Keller resigned from his position with Infopro, acquired the rights to the solution and created Jaeksoft to develop services for OpenSearchServer. Raphael Perez joined him, and they worked together to grow the user base and customer base and create the services. Jaeksoft raised a first round of seed capital in 2011.

== Features ==
Written in Java, OpenSearchServer can be run as a standalone server with a servlet container. The main features, which can be extended by using plugin architecture, are:

- Textual or Boolean type search,
- A crawler to index the following: web pages; rich format documents from files on local and remote systems; and contents from any JDBC database, such as Oracle, MySQL, Microsoft SQL Server,
- Full text analyzers and filters allowing indexing and searches in 16 languages,
- The Lucene library, which creates and updates the index - and presents the answers to queries using the most efficient algorithms for best performance and response times,
- An HTML renderer allowing the integration of the search box in a html/xhtml page, working with PHP and .NET, client library and XML over http API,
- Parsers for the content and metadata from most documents and formats, such as MS Office, OpenOffice, html/xhtml, XML, Adobe PDF, rtf, txt, mp3/4, wav, torrents...
- A series of caches to accelerate processes and deliver faster applications,
- Monitoring and administration: Alerting services, integrated scheduler, index replication, user management,
- Free online developers' documentation,
- Advanced functionality: faceted search, clustering, filters, snippets, synonyms, stopwords, highlighting, categorization, “find similar”, automatic thumbnail screenshot inclusion, boost/reduce relevance,
- OpenSearchServer exists as a Drupal module and a WordPress Plugin,
- The web interface is built around the Zkoss (ZK) framework.
