= Mahalo.com =

Web directory and question-and-answer site

Mahalo.com Incorporated
- Company type: Internet
- Website type: Search Engine
- Available in: English
- Founded: 2007
- Dissolved: 2014
- Headquarters: Santa Monica, California, U.S.
- Founder: Jason Calacanis
- Key people: Jason Calacanis; Founding CEO; Elliot C.R. Cook; COO; Bundy Kim; CTO
- Employees: 20
- Website: mahalo.com (defunct)
- Advertising: Google AdSense
- Launched: May 30, 2007
- Current status: Defunct

Mahalo.com was a web directory (or human search engine) and Internet-based knowledge exchange (question-and-answer website) launched in May 2007 by Jason Calacanis. It differentiated itself from algorithmic search engines like Google and Ask.com, as well as other directory sites like DMOZ and Yahoo! by tracking and building hand-crafted result sets for many of the currently popular search terms.

In 2014, Calacanis announced that Mahalo would enter server sunset as he moved his focus towards an app called Inside. He was quoted by TechCrunch saying "it makes 7 figures so we’re not shutting it off but we are not investing in it". Mahalo's website has since shut down.

== Directory ==
Mahalo.com contracted human editors to review websites and write search engine results pages that include text listings, as well as other media, such as photos and video. Each Mahalo search results page included links to the top seven sites, as well as other categorized information, and additional web pages from Google. The company also paid freelancers to create pages for piecework compensation.

Mahalo.com also offered "how to" guides.

== Mahalo Answers ==
On December 15, 2008, Mahalo launched a new service called Mahalo Answers, similar to Yahoo! Answers. A key difference was that Mahalo Answers allowed questioners to give a monetary reward (called a "tip") to the user who provided the most helpful response.

== Mobile applications ==
The company developed mobile apps, such as Learn Guitar.

== Criticism ==
At the SMX Conference in June 2007, Google software engineer Matt Cutts explained that while he supports different approaches to search it is untrue that humans have nothing to do with Google's search results. Cutts has categorized mahalo.com as spam. He used the terms "cookie cutter", "no value" and "no original content" to describe the website and described Jason Calacanis as "skilled... at baiting people" in the context of running Mahalo.com.

== Corporate details ==
=== Ownership and funding ===
Lead investors in Mahalo.com included Sequoia Capital's Michael Moritz; Elon Musk, founder of PayPal; and News Corporation. Other disclosed investors include Dallas Mavericks owner Mark Cuban and AOL chairman Ted Leonsis Jason Calacanis said in 2008 that he has enough funding to run Mahalo for four or five years without making a profit.

== Traffic and growth ==
Mahalo.com traffic had increased from roughly ten thousand visitors a month in July 2007, to two million visitors a month in January 2008.

On March 1, 2011, Calacanis and company president, Jason Rapp, announced via email that the recent changes in the Google search algorithm had significantly reduced traffic, resulting in the need to lay off about 10% of Mahalo employees. According to software firm Sistrix, Mahalo's Google generated search traffic declined by over 75% after these changes were made. President Jason Rapp exited the company in September 2012. In 2014, Jason Calacanis stated that these Google Panda updates had been "killing" Mahalo, which once had $10 million in yearly advertising revenue, that he had to lay off 80 full-time remote workers as a result, and that he desired "revenge" against Google and their web spam expert Matt Cutts.
