= ApexKB =

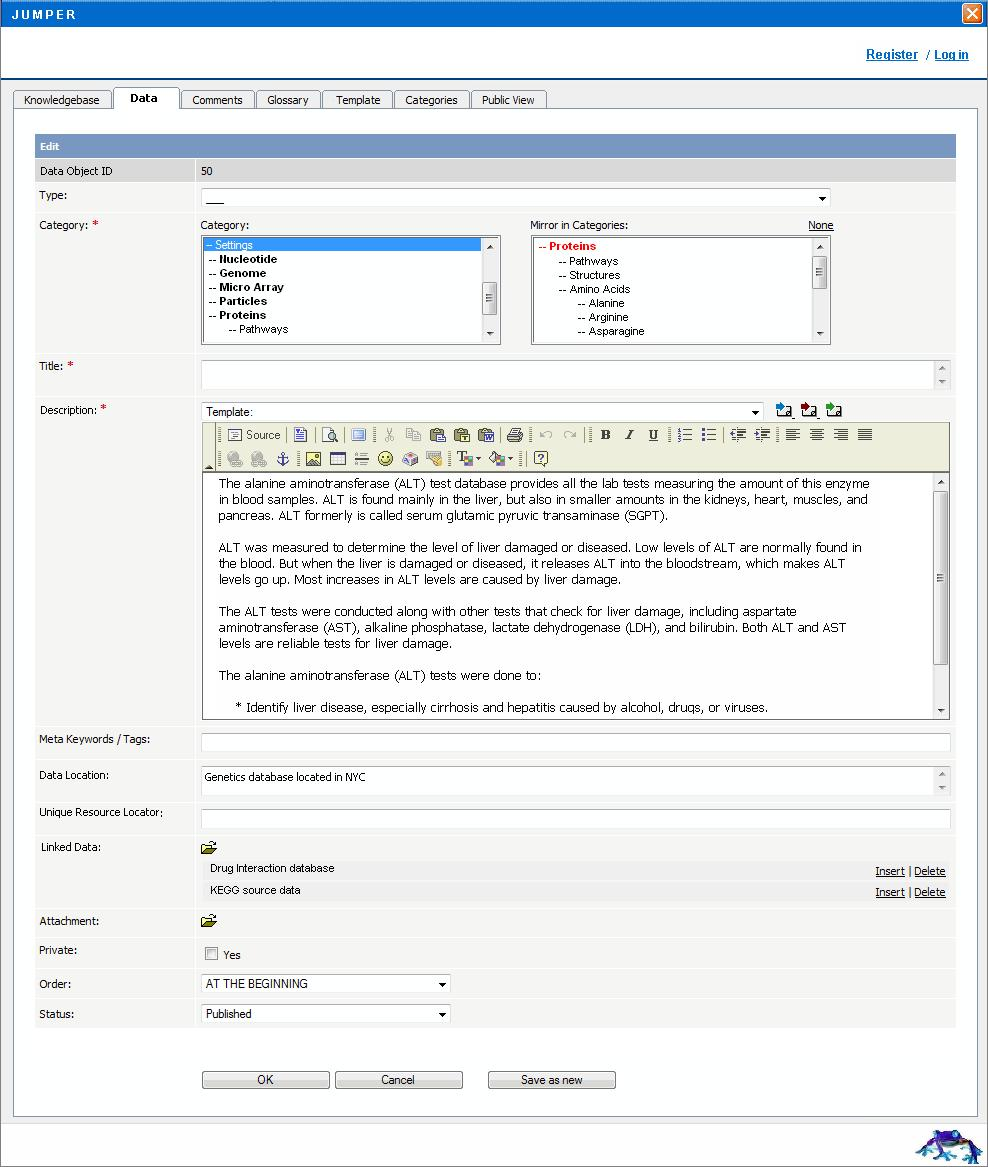
- Original author: Steve Perry
- Developer: Trilex Labs
- Release: 26 March 2009
- Final release: 2.0.1.9 / 15 November 2010; 15 years ago
- Written in: JavaScript, PHP
- Platform: Web platform
- Type: Collaborative search engine, enterprise bookmarking
- License: GNU General Public License
- Website: jumpernetworks.com
- Repository: sourceforge.net/projects/jumper/

ApexKB (formerly Jumper), is a discontinued free and open-source script for collaborative search and knowledge management. It is powered by a shared enterprise bookmarking engine that is a fork of KnowledgebasePublisher, and was publicly announced on 29 September 2008. A stable version of Jumper (version 2.0.1.1) was publicly released under the GNU General Public License and made available on SourceForge on 26 March 2009.

ApexKB users can compile and share collaborative bookmarks by crowdsourcing their knowledge, experience, and insights using knowledge tags. Users may tag, link, and rate structured data and unstructured data sources, including relational databases, flat file databases, medical imaging, content management systems, and any network file system. It is an interactive, user-submitted recommendation engine that uses peer-to-peer and social networking principles to reference any information located in distributed storage devices and capture the collective knowledge about it.

== Features ==
- Search any content, media, data, or people
- Reference data in any distributed storage system
- Create true Global Namespaces
- Build faceted classification systems
- User published data profiling
- Hyperdata linking of distributed data
- Group-based permissions
- Object-level access controls
- User and role management
- Descriptive tagging

== Function ==
ApexKB is enterprise web infrastructure for tagging and linking information resources. It can search and share contents across remote locations using knowledge tags to capture knowledge about the information in distributed storages. It collects these tags in a tag profile. The tag profiles are stored in an interactive knowledge base and search engine.

The app provides a Web 2.0 interface for searching structured and semi-structured data. Users can create tag profiles to bookmark information resources, share their experiences with those resources, and write reviews to help others evaluate them.

ApexKB is free and open-source, licensed under the terms of GPLv2. Users can purchase installations and support contracts under commercial, educational, or nonprofit licenses.

ApexKB is a web app written in PHP and JavaScript. It runs on a web server, such as Apache HTTP Server, Internet Information Services, lighttpd, Hiawatha, Cherokee, and Zeus Web Servers. By default, it supports storing the tag profile and associated knowledge tags in a MySQL database, but can be configured to use an IBM DB2, Microsoft SQL Server, or Oracle database instance. In addition, it can integrate with LDAP for user and group management.

Users access ApexKB via a web browser, although remote access can be open to the public or restricted to registered user accounts. The search engine in is the first thing users see when they open it. By clicking on a search result, users can view the full tag profile. The "tag profile" is a reference to an information resource located in a remote storage device. The tag profile captures knowledge about this resource using social tagging. The full tag profile is returned with the search results. Much like a card in a card catalog, it is a central reference point to collect and discover information associated with and about distributed information resources. With certain privileges a user can add a comment to the tag profile, expand upon the description, add new knowledge, or link the profile to another information resource. In addition, viewers can rate the value, accuracy or completeness of the tag profile. They can also choose to create a new tag profile that references content, media, or data regardless of format or location.

== Advantages ==
Jumper is a specialized Enterprise Social Search tool.

- leverages bookmarking to create a user-submitted index engine
- allows users to tag any data, not just web pages
- provides keyword and description tags
- also provides expanded knowledge tags
- knowledge tags can be customized to meet specific requirements
- tag terms can be aligned with corporate taxonomies or data dictionary
- a tag term is highlighted if it exists in the dictionary – user can click through to read the term
- group based permissions and easy integration with LDAP
- it does not deploy a tool bar in your web browser
- users do not share web page bookmarks from their browser
- bookmark tags are not standard but can be customized
- bookmarks more than web pages
- it does not provide user profiles or ask an expert features
- there are no discussion groups, no blogs or wikis

== History ==
Jumper was originally created as a project for the Sun Microsystems Jini Community. The software was first presented at the 6th annual JCM Sessions. Project Jump created a name server storing persistent names for data objects using a system of "natural language addressing" based on descriptive metrics, which have since been adopted by JXTA. It was originally developed by Steve Perry from his work as a data integration consultant.

The Jumper Open Source Project is a community effort, led by Jumper Networks, devoted to building and maintaining the open source version of Jumper.

Jumper Networks Inc., the company that provided commercial support for the Jumper Collaborative Search Engine, and the related company website were closed in September 2011.

== See also ==
- Comparison of enterprise bookmarking platforms
- Metadata discovery
