= KidRex =

Child-safe search engine

- Website type: Subsidiary
- Available in: English
- Website: www.alarms.org/kidrex/
- Registration: No
- Launched: December 2008
- Current status: Active

KidRex.org is a visual child-safe search engine powered by Google Programmable Search Engine. The website utilizes Google SafeSearch and maintains its own database of inappropriate websites and keywords. Additionally, social media websites are blocked by KidRex. Kidrex Pro is a premium version of the website with more features. In 2019, Kidrex Pro was stated to be re-imagined into a brand new service.

== Format ==
The site theme is stylized with colorful hand-drawn crayon and colored marker. Kidrex search results are both colorful and visual, designed for desktop use. The site is not mobile friendly. Looking up a blocked search term used to result in a 404 crayon-stylized error page, and would ask the user to "try again."

As of August 8, 2021, search results are redirected to Google, and the aforementioned search terms are no longer blocked.

== History ==
KidRex.org was launched in December 2008. In 2013, Time magazine put KidRex on its list of the top 50 websites of 2013 and compared it to Google.

In 2018, KidRex was acquired by Alarms.org. In a blog post, Alarms.org assured users that nothing would change in the near future. They told users that "the only thing we've done so far is remove the annoying ads that were on the bottom of the home page". Additionally, Alarms.org stated that they "have a long list of features in mind for KidRex, including a mobile app, customized versions for your school, and more.

== Controversy ==
In 2018, doubt was cast over KidRex's "safe search" claims, when a security researcher was able to use the search engine to return adult-orientated content search results.

== See also ==
- Kiddle
- List of search engines
- Search engine
- Comparison of search engines
