= Egerin =

Web search engine

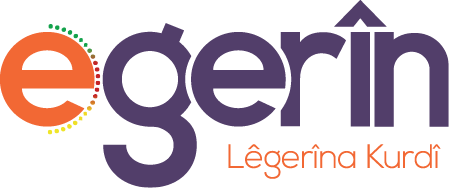
- Website type: Web search engine
- Available in: Kurdish
- Owner: Kawa Onatli
- Website: www.egerin.com
- Current status: Active

Egerin is a web search engine. It is the first search engine in Kurdish language and is focused on providing a fully functional search and blog system, including videos, image, and news for the Kurds.

== The Concept ==
Egerin was founded by Kawa Onatli, a Kurdish businessman who lives in Sweden. Onatli wanted to provide an alternative to the big search engines that do not have the Kurdish language available, targeting a wide audience of between 26 and 34 million Kurds.

== Technology ==
The search technology used is Solr with the rest of the technology stack being PostgreSQL, Scrapy and Python web frameworks.

== See also ==
- Comparison of web search engines
- List of search engines
- Timeline of web search engines
