= Ahmia =

Search engine for Tor onion services

- Website type: Web search engine
- Creator: Juha Nurmi
- Website: ahmia.fi juhanurmihxlp77nkq76byazcldy2hlmovfu2epvl5ankdibsot4csyd.onion ^{(Accessing link help)}
- Launched: 2014; 12 years ago
- Current status: Online

Ahmia is a clearnet search engine for Tor's onion services created by Juha Nurmi in 2014. Ahmia is accessible through both its clearweb website and its onion service version. It is one of the primary tools used by Tor users to discover and access onion websites.

== Overview ==
Developed during the 2014 Google Summer of Code by Juha Nurmi with support from the Tor Project, Ahmia indexes onion websites on the Tor network. The three components of the search engine are open-source: the crawler is based on Scrapy, the index component is built with Elasticsearch, and the website component is developed with Django.

Ahmia has a strict policy of filtering child sexual abuse material, and since October 2023, the filter has been expanded to include all sexually related searches, citing widespread distribution and search of child sexual abuse on Tor as the reason. A study in Scientific Reports explained the filtering policies for Ahmia and its role in combating the distribution of illicit content on the Tor network. The paper also acknowledged the contributions of the first author, Juha Nurmi, the creator of Ahmia as he expanded filtering policies in November 2023. According to the scientific publication, the decision to broaden content filtering was the result of the research findings, which showed that 11 percent of search sessions sought child sexual abuse material on Tor and that around one-fifth of onion websites hosted such unlawful content.

The service partners with GlobaLeaks's submissions and Tor2web statistics for hidden service discovery and as of July 2015 has indexed about 5000 sites. Ahmia is also affiliated with Hermes Center for Transparency and Digital Rights, an organization that promotes transparency and freedom-enabling technologies.

In July 2015 the site published a list of hundreds of fraudulent clones of web pages (including such sites as DuckDuckGo, as well a dark web page). According to Nurmi, "someone runs a fake site on a similar address to the original one and tries to fool people with that" with the intent of scamming people (e.g. gathering bitcoin by spoofing bitcoin addresses).

== See also ==
- Comparison of web search engines
- List of search engines
- List of search engines by popularity
