= Blackle =

Search engine

- Website type: Search engine
- Available in: English
- Owner: Heap Media Australia
- Creator: Toby Heap
- Website: www.blackle.com
- Commercial: Yes
- Registration: No
- Launched: January 2007; 19 years ago
- Current status: Active

Blackle is an internet search engine powered by Google Programmable Search Engine. It was created by Toby Heap of Heap Media Australia with the goal of saving energy by displaying a black background with grayish-white text color on search results. As of July 2023, Blackle claims to have saved over 10.07 MWh of electrical energy.

== Concept ==
The concept behind Blackle is that computer monitors can use less energy by displaying darker colors. Blackle's design is based on a study that tested a variety of CRT and LCD monitors. However, the energy-saving claims, especially for users of LCD screens with a constant backlight, are disputed.

This concept was brought to the attention of Heap Media by a blog post, estimating that Google could save 750 megawatt hours a year by using it for CRT screens. The homepage of Blackle provides a count of the number of watt hours claimed to have been saved by enabling this concept.

== History ==
The Blackle Homepage (as of January 2021) The Blackle Homepage (as of April 2007)

Blackle launched in January 2007, gaining popularity and being featured in multiple mainstream media outlets during that time.

Blackle International, which translated Blackle into Portuguese, French, Czech, Italian, and Dutch, was retired in 2019. The International page still exists, but every link listed has experienced link rot. As of 2021, the site is only available in English.

== See also ==
- Light-on-dark color scheme
- Performance per watt
- Comparison of web search engines
- List of search engines
- List of search engines by popularity
