= Petal Search =

Chinese internet search engine

- Developer: Huawei Technologies Co., Ltd.
- Release: 2020
- Stable release: 12.0.0.300
- Included with: Huawei phones and tablets
- Available in: Multilingual
- Type: Search engine
- Website: Huawei Appgallery

Petal Search (also known simply as Petal) is a mobile search-based application for Android, owned and operated by Huawei and aimed at allowing users to find apps and web results delivered by Microsoft Bing.

== History ==
In 2019, multinational technology company Huawei was affected by the sanctions enforced during an ongoing international trade ban because the United States wanted to remove Huawei from its market.

Huawei's new and upcoming Android smartphones were denied access to Google Mobile Services. Due to these restrictions, Huawei decided to expand the scope of the Petal Search service to create an independent search engine in response to sanctions that barred Huawei from using Google Mobile Services.

In 2022, Petal Search has been announced as the winner of iF DESIGN AWARD 2022.

It originally had an independent search engine under the same name available on the web, but it was quietly discontinued on 25 June 2023.

== Functionality ==
=== Search channels ===
The engine provides comprehensive search functionality including text, voice, visual, news, video, app, shopping, travel, and local searches. It can present mobile app results from the Huawei AppGallery and other trusted app stores.

==== Visual search ====
Petal Search supports searching for photos, reverse image search, and the standard text-based search. Visual search functions rely on Huawei's visual search technology, HiTouch.

It can search for and detect multiple objects in an image at the same time. For example, when a user takes a photo of a sofa with a blanket and a cushion on it, Petal Search can identify all three items, and then deliver search results based on that.

==== Voice search ====
Petal Search supports voice search for English, Spanish, French, Arabic, Turkish and other languages.

==== News search ====
Petal Search crawls and lists results from news outlets.

==== Video search ====
Petal Search provides users specifically with video URLs if chosen by the user. If a general query returns video results it will also be included in the results page.

==== App search ====
Petal Search offers a mobile application search functionality which allows users to search the AppGallery and other third-party sources.

==== Shopping search ====
Users can search for consumer products on Petal Search and then follow a link to the online store if they wish to make a purchase.

==== Travel search ====
A flight reservation function is available on Petal Search. Users can also book hotels or search for information on flights such as the arrival time. Nearby restaurants, local tourist spots and attractions and local events can also be searched for.

==== Local search ====
The Near Me function facilitate finding local businesses, nearby products and services and consumer reviews. Data providers include Uberall, Tripadvisor, Yell, and Foursquare.

=== Third-party app stores ===
Petal Search is a mobile search engine and also provides users who are searching for mobile phone applications with results from the AppGallery (Huawei's official app store) and other third-party stores.

When a user searches for an app, Petal Search includes results from "trusted" app stores.

This feature is integrated with the AppGallery.

== Design ==
Petal Search's logo design is based on the shape of a magnifying glass.

The main focus is currently to develop the service for mobile devices; therefore, its design is rooted in a "mobile-first" approach.

It also offers a "dark mode" option.

== Availability ==
Petal Search is active in various markets around the world, currently focusing its operations in European countries, mainly in Spain and Turkey.

As of November 2021, Petal Search supports 55 languages and is available in 170 countries and regions around the world. Currently, Petal Search application is available to download in Huawei AppGallery and Apple App Store.

== See also ==
- List of search engines
- Comparison of search engines
- Huawei Mobile Services
- Petal Maps
