= Million Short =

Canadian search engine

- Website type: Search engine
- Available in: English
- Owner: Exponential Labs
- Website: millionshort.com
- Launched: April 30, 2012; 14 years ago
- Current status: Online

Million Short is a web search engine from Toronto-based startup Exponential Labs. The search engine, which brands itself as “more of a discovery engine,” allows users to filter the top million websites on the internet out of their search, resulting in a unique set of results and placing an emphasis on content discovery. This approach to search is also designed to combat the impact that aggressive black and grey hat SEO practices have on mainstream search results.

== History ==
Million Short was conceived in 2012 by Exponential Labs. The program gathers results like any other engine, then uses web rankings to exclude the most popular sites before producing its final results. More recently the company has continued to develop its own search technology and web crawling capacities, and uses proprietary data to help inform the Million Short search results.

Upon its April 2012 launch, Million Short earned significant attention, first from online communities such as Reddit and Hacker News, and then from both blogs and mainstream publications like the BBC, TechCrunch, The Atlantic, The Verge, Wired and The New York Times.

The months following Million Short's launch saw a number of updates to the engine, including international support, mobile and tablet optimization, browser search extensions, design updates, and voice search.

Million Short was also the focus of research study How Relevant is the Long Tail? A Relevance Assessment Study on Million Short. Published in arXiv, a relevance assessment study with the Million Short long-tail web search engine.

== Marketing and related projects ==
Following the initial interest in Million Short, Exponential Labs launched a series of projects related to Million Short, both as marketing endeavors and expansions on the search engine's initial premise.

=== Million Tall ===
Billed as the “inverse” of Million Short, Million Tall is another search engine created by Exponential Labs that indexes and displays results from only the top million sites on the internet (i.e., those that Million Short excludes). The project launched in July 2012, intended to highlight the frequency with which leading search engines display results from the same small number of websites. Its tagline asks: “Imagine a search engine that only indexed the top 1 million sites on the web. Would you even notice?”

=== Million Short It On ===
In September 2012, Exponential Labs released Million Short It On, a site presenting a blind test between Million Short and Google search results. Users were presented with two sets of unbranded results for a given term, and instructed to determine which results were more useful. The project was based—both in name and concept—on Bing It On, a similar marketing campaign launched earlier that year, which, in turn, drew inspiration from the Pepsi Challenge in the 1970s.

=== Million Short DNS ===
December 2012 saw the release of Million Short DNS, a series of domain name system servers programmed to exclude specific domains on the internet, redirecting them instead to an error page. Servers are available to exclude either the top million, hundred thousand, ten thousand, thousand, or hundred sites on the internet.

In addition to redirecting the URLs of excluded domains, the servers will not load any content hosted on these domains. In some cases this results in missing images, typefaces, or JavaScript files, lending a radically different browsing experience even to sites that are not excluded.

== See also ==
- List of search engines
- Search engine
- Comparison of search engines
