= MetaGer =

Privacy-focused internet search engine

- Website type: Search engine
- Headquarters: {{{location_country}}}
- Country of origin: Germany
- Owner: SuMa e.V.
- Website: metager.org
- Launched: 1996

MetaGer is a metasearch engine focused on protecting users' privacy. It is based in Germany and is hosted as a cooperation between the German NGO 'SUMA-EV - Association for Free Access to Knowledge' and the University of Hannover.

== History ==
On 29 August 2013, an English version of MetaGer, known as the MetaGer.net, is available.

On 16 August 2016, MetaGer's source code was released on GitLab.

On 10 September 2024, MetaGer announced that it would no longer offer the free tier of its service due to a contract termination from Yahoo!, who provided access to Microsoft Bing's search results.

== Features ==
The system is built on 24 small-scale web crawlers under MetaGer's own control.

Search queries are relayed to as many as 50 search engines. Their main Web results coming from Microsoft Bing, Mojeek and Brave Search. The results are filtered, compiled and sorted before being presented to the user.

Users can select the search engines to query, according to their individual choices among other options (such as "check for availability and sort by date"). Users can create personal blacklists to filter out websites.

MetaGer provides access to their services only through encrypted connections.

As of December 2013, there is also a Tor Hidden Service that allows users to access the MetaGer search functionality from within the Tor network. Since February 2014, MetaGer additionally offers the option to open the result webpages anonymously.
