= Startpage =

Privacy-focused search engine

- Logo since 2026 and wordmark since 2021

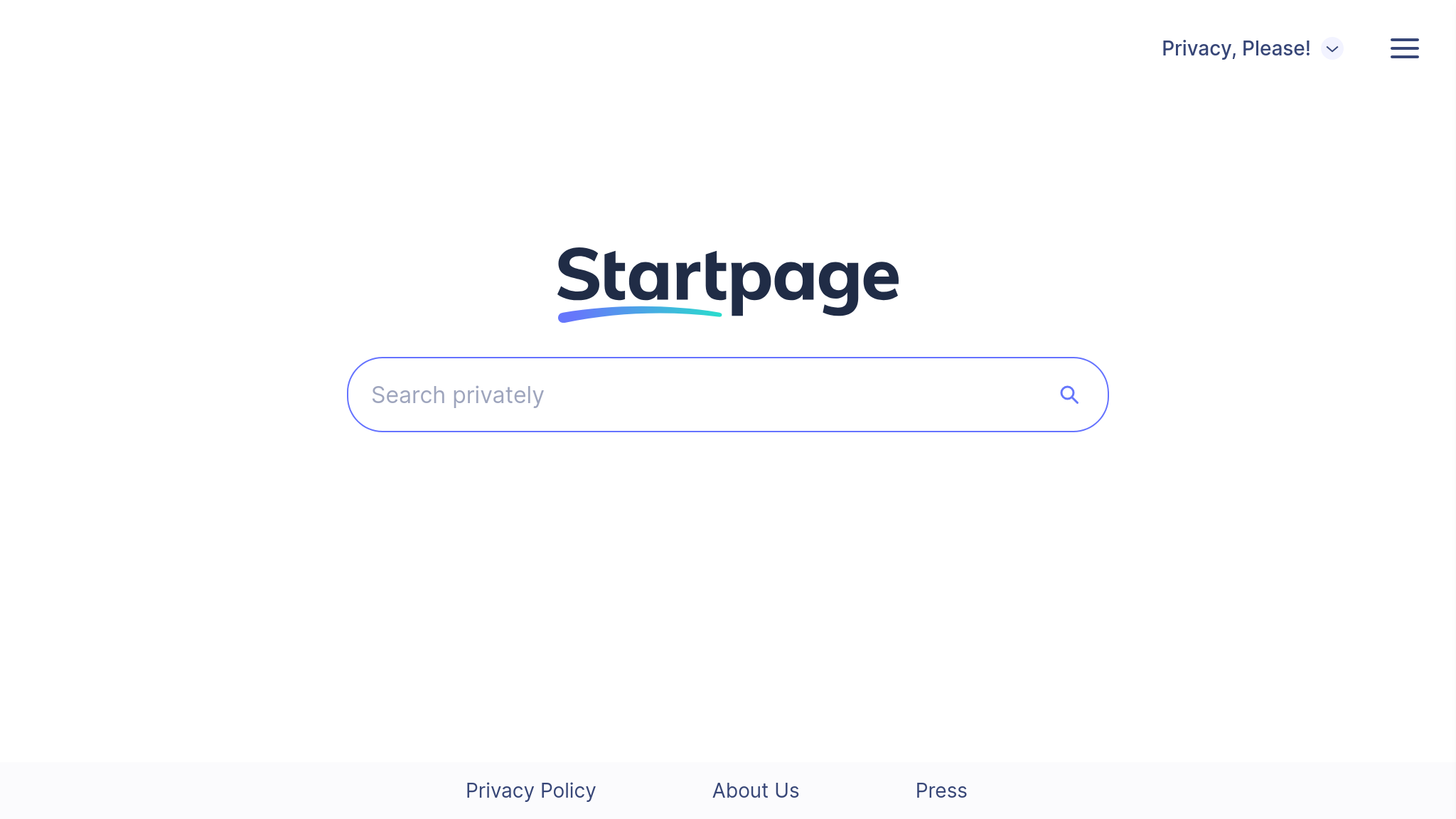
- Screenshot
- Website type: Search engine Proxy server
- Available in: Multilingual
- Headquarters: Wilhelmina van Pruisenweg 104, The Hague, the Netherlands
- Owner: Surfboard Holding BV
- Parent: System1
- Website: startpage.com
- Launched: 1998; 28 years ago (as Ixquick); January 28, 1998; 28 years ago (as Startpage)

Startpage, also known as Startpage.com, is a Netherlands-based search engine website that highlights privacy as its distinguishing feature. The website advertises that it allows users to obtain Bing Search and Google Search results while protecting users' privacy by not storing personal information or search data and removing all trackers. Startpage.com also includes an Anonymous View browsing feature that allows users the option to open search results via proxy for increased anonymity. Startpage is owned and operated by Surfboard Holding BV, which is majority owned by System1, an American internet advertising company.

== History ==
=== Early history ===
Ixquick was created in 1998 by David Bodnick in New York City. Initially, it provided metasearch for 14 different web and directory search engines as well as images, news, and MP3 engines. Results were sorted after evaluating how relevant each of the search tools found the query. Surfboard Holding BV, a company based in Zeist, Netherlands, and led by CEO Robert E. G. Beens, acquired Ixquick in 2000. Ixquick was re-launched on 23 March 2005 with new features including a redesigned metasearch algorithm.

The Ixquick webpage as it appeared in 2001

Startpage.com began as a web directory on January 28, 1998 and started mirroring Ixquick in 2003. On 7 July 2009, the company re-launched Startpage.com to fetch results only from the Google search engine. Prior to the release of Tor Browser version 4.5 in April 2015, Startpage.com was its default search engine.

=== Merger and recent history ===
On 29 March 2016, Ixquick.com was merged into the Startpage.com search engine. However, Ixquick was still available at Ixquick.eu, Ixquick.info and the Ixquick Search App until 2 April 2018, when they were discontinued. As of 2017, Startpage fields an estimated 2 billion searches. The company was one of 200 European companies that opposed the F.C.C. implementation of policies ending net neutrality.

In October 2019, Privacy One Group, owned by adtech company System1, acquired a majority stake in Startpage. An initial lack of transparency surrounding the deal caused some concern among privacy researchers, leading to its removal from the PrivacyTools review website. After responding to questions from PrivacyTools team members, Startpage was able to clarify that the acquisition would not impact their privacy-focused mission, and its recommendation was ultimately restored. According to the company, its "founders may unilaterally reject any potential technical change that could negatively affect user privacy". By maintaining its headquarters and operations in the Netherlands, Startpage continues to be protected by Dutch and European Union (EU) privacy laws.

In May 2020, Vivaldi announced that its browser had added Startpage as an optional or default search engine.

In August 2026, Mozilla added Startpage as a built-in default search engine choice in Firefox 154 for desktop users in Germany, France, Austria, Switzerland, and the Netherlands, with support for Android and iOS planned to follow.

== Products ==
On 27 June 2006, following criticism of Google Shopping, the website began to delete private details of its users. Ixquick stated that it does not share the personal information of users with other search engines or with the provider of its sponsored results. According to The New York Times' Wirecutter, Startpage does not store user's personal information or search data. A May 2020 review of the website on ZDNet also states that Startpage "does not track, log, or share data or searching history".

In 2011, Startpage received the European Privacy Seal, a European Union–sponsored initiative that indicates compliance with EU laws and regulations on data security and privacy through a series of design and technical audits. It was re-certified in 2013 and 2015. The company has also completely ended the recording of user IP addresses since January 2009. Because Startpage is based in the Netherlands, it is also "not subject to US laws like the Patriot Act, and cannot be forced to comply with US dragnet surveillance programs, like PRISM." Startpage has also contributed €20,000 to NOYB, the non-profit organization founded by Max Schrems, which is committed to launching strategic court cases and media initiatives in support of the EU's General Data Protection Regulation.

The company also provides a stand-alone proxy service, Startpage.com Proxy, which is incorporated into the Startpage search engine. This feature, known as Anonymous View since 2018, allows users the option to open all search results (except advertisements) via the proxy.

=== StartMail ===
StartMail, founded in 2014 by Startpage CEO Beens, was developed to offer a privacy protecting email service. StartMail also allows the creation of disposable and permanent email aliases for each account. Phil Zimmermann, the inventor of the PGP encryption system who Startpage hired in 2018 to advise the company on privacy technology, has also helped develop StartMail's PGP-encrypted email service.

Since Startpage.com does not collect user data, it does not serve targeted advertising based on user data history. The company generates revenue from its search engine by providing contextual advertising based on the keyword used to perform a search.

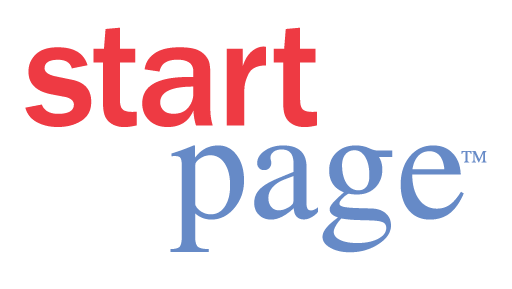
First Startpage logo, until 2015

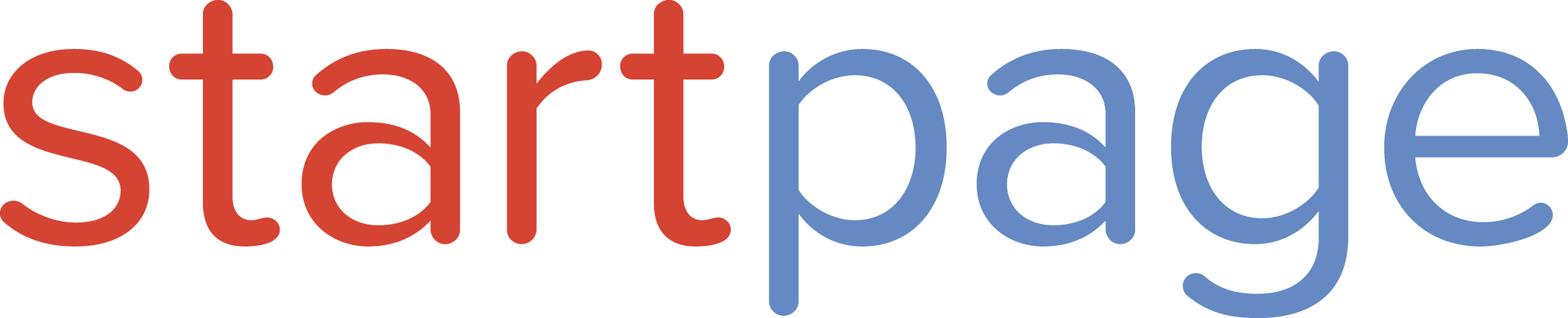
Second Startpage logo, until 2018

Third Startpage logo, until 2021

Fourth Startpage logo, current

== Features ==
Startpage uses results from Google, for which it pays. As of July 2020, Startpage allows searches in 82 languages, including Bengali, Danish, Dutch, English, Finnish, French, German, Italian, Japanese, Korean, Norwegian, Polish, Portuguese, Simplified and Traditional Chinese, Spanish, Swedish and Turkish.

Search results don’t include the carousels at the top of Google searches and instead go straight to the results. The website has tabs for web searches as well as tabs for image and video searches. In November 2019, Startpage added a tab for news. According to the company, news searches are "not curated or personalized" and "every user who looks up the same term at the same time gets the same news".

In June 2022, the company added "Instant Answers", a feature that displays information directly on the search engine for topics such as weather, maps and Wikipedia. Unlike Google, Startpage doesn't offer "featured snippets", which are answers extracted directly from relevant websites. In contrast, Startpage's "Instant Answers" only get information from a dozen websites.

=== Tor access ===
Startpage was used for anonymous searching on the v3 Tor network link startpagel6srwcjlue4zgq3zevrujfaow726kjytqbbjyrswwmjzcqd.onion ^{(Accessing link help)}.

== See also ==
- Brave Search
- Comparison of search engines
- DuckDuckGo
- List of search engines
- Naver
- Qwant
- Seznam
