= Fireball (search engine) =

Search engine

- Screenshot of Fireball home page as of 2019
- Available in: German, English
- Founded: Berlin, Germany (1996)
- Headquarters: Munich, Germany
- Industry: Search engine
- Website: fireball.de
- Current status: Active

Fireball is a search engine operated by Fireball Labs GmbH, based in Munich, Germany. Founded in 1996, Fireball was once the leading search engine in Germany, but quickly declined after being taken over by Lycos Europe and the rise of Google. In 2016, Fireball was re-established as an independent company and relaunched.

== History ==
Fireball was originally called Flipper and started as a project of the Faculty of Computer Science at Technische Universität Berlin built by Oli Kai Paulus, Helmut Hoffer (née Oertel) von Ankershoffen, Nurhan Yildirim and Benhui Chen as contract work for Gruner + Jahr, one of Germany's largest publishing houses. It was renamed to Fireball in 1997. The same year, T-Online chose Fireball as its search engine. Fireball quickly rose in popularity and became one of the largest search engines in Germany. By 1998, it was considered market-leader in the country and launched an e-mail service called Firemail and a news search engine called Paperball. Fireball was mostly focused on German-language results, for international search results it used AltaVista.

In March 2000 Fireball was taken over by Lycos Europe. Under the ownership of Lycos, development of Fireball slowed. The takeover by Lycos as well as the rise of Google caused Fireball to massively lose market-share within a short time. By mid-2000, Fireball's market share had dropped to 22% and further eroded to 10% in 2001. Despite several attempts to relaunch the service, its market share continued to decline to 2.5% in 2002 and only 0.3% in 2005. In 2002, Fireball ceased to be an independent company and was run directly by Lycos Europe.

In 2009, Lycos Europe was dissolved and Fireball was sold to Swiss company Ambrosia AG, which ran the service until 2016. In 2016, Fireball was again sold, this time to a group of investors from Munich who re-established Fireball as an independent company. A completely overhauled version of the service, with a strong focus on privacy, was launched the same year.

== See also ==
- List of search engines
- Search engine
- Comparison of search engines
