= Search.ch =

Swiss search engine and web portal

Search.ch logo

Search.ch is a search engine and web portal based in Zürich, Switzerland. It was founded in 1995 by Rudolf Räber and Bernhard Seefeld as a regional search engine.

The search engine allows the user to restrict their search to a specific region of Switzerland, such as a canton or a city. The web crawler only looks at sites within the .ch and .li top-level domains, along with a small number of Swiss websites.

== See also ==
- List of search engines
- Search engine
- Comparison of search engines
