= Kiddle (search engine) =

Search engine emphasizing safety for children

- Kiddle's desktop home page on January 16, 2021
- Website type: Search engine
- Available in: English, Spanish
- Website: www.kiddle.co
- Registration: No
- Launched: 2014

Kiddle (also called by its domain Kiddle.co) is a web search engine and online encyclopedia emphasizing safety for children. Kiddle search is powered by Google Search Engine and employs Google with additional filters. Kiddle is powered by Google Custom Search but is not affiliated with Google LLC. It has been mistaken for a Google product in several news articles and blogs due to its name.

== History ==
Kiddle's domain was registered in 2014. The .co domain was chosen by the designers in order to emphasize the search engine's "children only" target audience.

Since July 2023, Kiddle is also available in Spanish.

Kiddle resdesigned its logo in September 2025, giving the homepage a more colorful and modern look.

== Format ==
Once the user enters topics in the search toolbar, Kiddle returns and ranks its findings, and pushes child-safe content higher in its search results. It appears like a Google Programmable Search Engine window with an outer space stylized theme for their pages. Kiddle presents search results with the first three results being deemed safe and written specifically for kids and "checked by Kiddle editors", the next four being safe sites not written specially for kids, but presented in kid friendly language. The eighth result and anything else beyond are safe sites written for adults but harder to understand for kids. Results presented are filtered through Google SafeSearch.

If the user enters terms that are considered inappropriate, a picture of a robot is displayed, telling the user to try again.

== Kpedia ==
Kiddle Encyclopedia (Kpedia) is an online encyclopedia available from their search engine. It lists over 700,000 articles, and is "based on selected content and facts from Wikipedia, rewritten for children." Kiddle positions its Kpedia as an educational resource to be used for "school homework help and general education," and includes their articles in search results. The software is powered by MediaWiki, the same software that powers Wikipedia.

== Controversy ==
In 2016, Kiddle came under criticism for blocking various LGBTQ-related search terms, with their rationale being that the keywords were not suitable for small children.

Due to criticism, Kiddle unblocked these keywords.

== See also ==
- Comparison of search engines
- KidRex
- List of search engines
