= Brave Leo =

Large language model-based chatbot

- Developers: Brave Software, Inc.
- Release: 2 November 2023; 3 years ago
- Operating system: Android, iOS, Windows, MacOS, Linux
- Included with: Brave
- Type: Chatbot
- Website: brave.com/leo

Brave Leo is a large language model-based chatbot developed by Brave Software and built into the Brave browser. Marketed as a privacy-preserving assistant, Leo can summarize and translate web pages, answer questions about page content, generate text and code, and hold conversational exchanges, all from the browser's address bar or sidebar.

== History ==
Brave introduced Leo to desktop users on November 2, 2023, with version 1.60 of the browser, and said at launch that iOS and Android versions would follow "in the coming months."

In January 2024, with desktop browser version 1.62, Brave made the open-source Mixtral 8x7B model from Mistral AI the default for both the free and premium tiers, alongside Claude Instant from Anthropic and Llama 2 13B from Meta Platforms.

Brave subsequently expanded and updated the available models. By 2026, Brave hosted a range of LLMs through its own infrastructure, including models from Qwen, Llama, and Anthropic Claude (Haiku, Sonnet, and Opus). Later additions included a "Bring Your Own Model" (BYOM) option for connecting external models, a "Skills" feature announced in December 2025, with which the user can assign shorthand for prompts, and an early-testing agentic "AI browsing" mode also announced in December 2025.

== Features ==
Leo is accessible from the Brave address bar or as a sidebar panel beside any web page. It can produce real-time summaries of web pages and videos, answer questions about on-page content, generate and rewrite text, translate pages, and write code. Users may select a language model manually or rely on an automatic mode, with the default model handling most tasks; advanced model selection is available at brave://settings/leo-ai.

Leo offers a free tier with usage rate limits and a premium tier, Leo Premium, priced at $15 per month (or $149.99 annually), which provides higher rate limits and access to larger models.

== Privacy ==
Brave positions Leo as privacy-preserving. According to the company, conversations are not recorded or used for model training, and no account or login is required to use Leo. Requests are routed through a reverse proxy so that they cannot be linked to a user's IP address, and responses are discarded immediately after generation. All models, including third-party Claude models, are hosted on Brave's own infrastructure. Premium subscribers receive unlinkable tokens so that payment details cannot be associated with usage.

== Reception and controversies ==
In November 2023, PC World reported that the free version of Leo declined to answer questions about the 2020 United States presidential election.

== See also ==
- Brave Search
- Brave (web browser)
