= Google Programmable Search Engine =

Platform for creating custom search engines based on Google Search

Google Programmable Search
- Website type: Web search engine
- Owner: Google (Alphabet)
- Creator: Google
- Revenue: From AdWords
- Website: cse.google.com
- Commercial: Yes
- Registration: Required
- Launched: October 24, 2006; 19 years ago (as Google Co-op)
- Current status: Active
- Written in: C++

Google Programmable Search Engine (formerly known as Google Custom Search and Google Co-op) is a platform provided by Google that allows web developers to feature specialized information in web searches, refine and categorize queries and create customized search engines, based on Google Search.

== Services ==
=== Custom Search Engine ===
Google Co-op logo

Released on October 23, 2006, Google Custom Search Engine started as a way to let webmasters index and provide search for their own sites. It also let anyone create their own search engine by searching a list of links as well as the sites linked from those sites. This allows custom search engine users to narrow the web that they are searching and have a less cluttered search experience. You can also limit the results to only originate from specific countries. The search engine can be integrated into Chrome and Firefox browsers.

From 2014 until 2016, Custom Search Engines were among those found to be vulnerable to a man-in-the-middle attack leading to malware being installed on over 1 million computers.

In 2019, the European Union fined Google for anti-trust violations for not allowing other advertisers to advertise in its custom search engines.

As of January 2026, custom search engines can no longer query more than 50 domains.

=== Topics ===
Topics are specific areas of search, which can be developed by people with knowledge of a certain subject. These topics are then displayed at the top of relevant Google web searches, so the user can refine the searches to what they want.

== See also ==
- Bing Custom Search (since 2017)
- Brave Search § Goggles
- Kagi
- Yahoo! Search BOSS – Discontinued custom search tool
