= Kagi =

Paid search engine

- Website type: Web search engine
- Founded: 2018
- Headquarters: Palo Alto, California
- Country of origin: USA
- CEO: Vladimir Prelovac
- Key people: Vladimir Prelovac, Raghu Murthi, Dr. Norman Winarsky
- Website: www.kagi.com; kagi2pv5bdcxxqla5itjzje2cgdccuwept5ub6patvmvn3qgmgjd6vid.onion ^{(Accessing link help)}
- Advertising: No
- Commercial: Yes
- Registration: Required
- Current status: Online

Kagi (/ˈkɑːɡi/ KAH-ghee) (stylized as kagi) is a paid ad-free search engine developed by Kagi Inc., a company located in Palo Alto, California.

Its name is derived from the Japanese character 鍵 (kagi), which translates to 'key'.

== Features ==
=== Kagi ===
Kagi functions as a metasearch engine to aggregate search results from other established search engines with its own indexes for websites and news. They run their own crawler under the brand name Teclis, although that index is only used for small-web searches. As of April 2024, Kagi listed that its sources for search results were derived from Google, Brave Search, Mojeek and Yandex.

Kagi offers many different customization options. The search engine results may be filtered by category with a feature (called "lenses"), which can be edited by users. Available lenses include filtering to find discussions, podcasts, search directly for PDF files and filtering to focus content from smaller websites like blogs or forums. Websites shown in search results can be prioritized, de-prioritized, pinned, or blocked. Additionally, Kagi also offers the ability to customize of the user interface with a custom CSS editor, a video search tool which lets you replace clickbait thumbnails from videos with a screenshot of the actual video, a toggle which disables all AI-generated images from appearing in search results, and shortcuts (called "bangs") which can be created and allow searches to be redirected to different websites.

There is also an opt-in AI quick response feature that summarizes a search query and gives sources. Details about websites can be shown in the search results such as creation date and counts of ads and trackers, some of which can be used to customize your future search results.

Internet activist Cory Doctorow praised the quality of Kagi's search results as "sorcerous", comparing the search engine favorably with Google Search.

=== Orion Browser ===
Orion Browser
- Developer: Kagi Inc.
- Operating system: iOS; macOS; Linux (beta)
- License: Proprietary freeware
- Website: orionbrowser.com
- Repository: github.com/OrionBrowser

Orion Browser is a proprietary browser for iOS, iPadOS and macOS. It is developed by Kagi Inc. and is based on the WebKit engine – the same engine as Apple's Safari. Orion offers a number of different features not found on Safari, such as natively supporting WebExtensions designed for Chromium and Firefox. Orion Browser is designed to be used with Kagi, but users have the option to use any search engine. As of September 2026, stable releases are available to download on macOS, iOS and iPadOS devices.

Kagi Inc. attempted to port Orion Browser to Linux and Windows, but abandoned their develpment on October 2, 2026. On March 7, 2025, Kagi Inc. announced that development of Orion Browser for Linux had begun. As of November 2026, the beta release of Linux port of the browser is still available for download, while Kagi never released any builds for Windows. On October 2, 2026, Kagi ended development of Orion for Linux and Windows. Kagi expressed intent to open source these ports after finding a suitable maintainer and planned to publish details 30 days from the initial announcement. As of November, Kagi did not make any anouncements yet.

In June 2025, Lifehacker praised Orion's ad blocking by default and faulted it for not supporting tab management or VPNs.

=== Kagi Assistant ===
On September 4, 2024, Kagi Assistant was announced. The Assistant uses generative artificial intelligence models from third party AI providers which are accessed anonymously with their respective APIs to preserve user privacy and can use Kagi Search to improve their output. Users can choose the AI model they want to use, and custom assistants can be created for different tasks. Originally limited to Ultimate plan members, the service was made available for all users in April 2025.

Reception to the assistance was positive. Nieman Lab's Neel Dhanesha found that the assistant did a relatively good job at citing its sources in its AI overviews compared with other models, and Willow Roberts from Digital Trends appreciated how easy it was to fact-check due to hyperlinked inline citations.

=== Kagi Translate ===
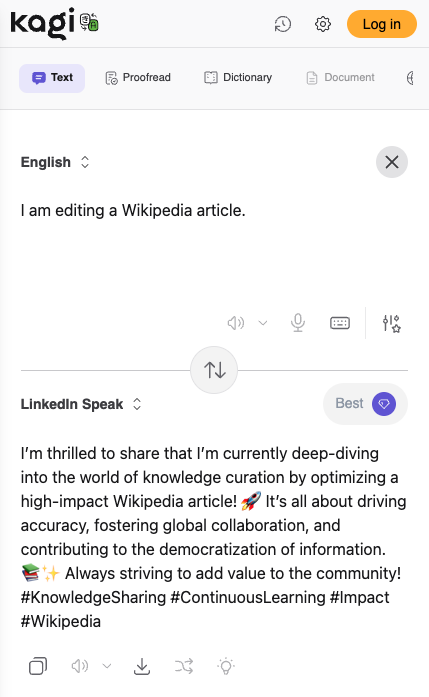
Kagi Translate can translate into corporate jargon typical of LinkedIn posts, a feature which became viral in March 2026.

In 2024, Kagi Translate was introduced. It's similar to Google Translate but will also give multiple options to choose from, explaining the differences. It uses a combination of LLMs.

In March 2026, Kagi Translate received an influx of popularity due to offering more comedic language translation options. These include "Gen Z Slang", which translates a given body of text into something which a Generation Z person would write, LinkedIn Speak, allowing users to translate plain English into corporate jargon similar to that used in LinkedIn posts and Pirate Speak.

=== Kagi News ===
On September 30, 2025, Kagi News was introduced. It provides a daily summary of worldwide news using AI with customisable topics and sections in each summary. News is collated from an open-source list of public RSS feeds, updated once a day to prevent media fatigue. Summaries can be translated into any language supported by Kagi Translate. Kagi News is free and can be used without an account. An AI feature of Kagi News is the World Tension index. The app assigns a value to the global political climate based on the current news and tracks it on a graph.

Writing for Android Authority, journalist Andy Walker praised Kagi News for its design and features but found problems with its 12-story limit per category, slower content updates and errors in AI summaries.

== Business model ==
Kagi has no ads or sponsored search results, instead generating its revenue from an account-based, subscription service. Kagi allows users to make up to 100 free searches before they must subscribe to one of the monthly subscription plan tiers below:

1. A $5 individual tier, allowing a user to make up to 300 searches a month (formerly 500)
2. A $10 individual tier, allowing a user to make unlimited monthly searches
3. A $25 individual tier which, in addition to unlimited monthly searches, allows users early access to upcoming features
4. A $14 family tier, allowing up to two users to make unlimited monthly searches
5. A $20 family tier, allowing up to six users to make unlimited monthly searches

Additionally, users may instead make a yearly subscription to the service at a 10% discount.

As of June 9, 2025, Kagi reportedly had roughly 50,000 subscribed members which made 845,200 searches on that day. As of September 2026, Kagi reportedly has over 75,000 subscribers

== Privacy ==
The site claims not to collect user actions such as searches.

In 2025, the company implemented the privacy pass protocol in their search product, allowing users to authenticate as a paying user while not being identifiable. The same day, the company also announced the availability of their services on Tor.

== API ==
The Kagi API is currently in a 'v0' beta status, with ongoing changes and feature additions.

Kagi has the following APIs (paid):

1. Kagi Search API (invite-only at the moment)
2. Universal Summarizer API (public)
3. FastGPT API (public)
4. Web and News Enrichment API (public, exposes Kagi's own indexes Teclis and TinyGem)

And the following non-paid API:

1. Kagi Small Web RSS feed (public)

== See also ==
- Comparison of search engines
- List of search engines
