= Dark mode =

Type of color scheme

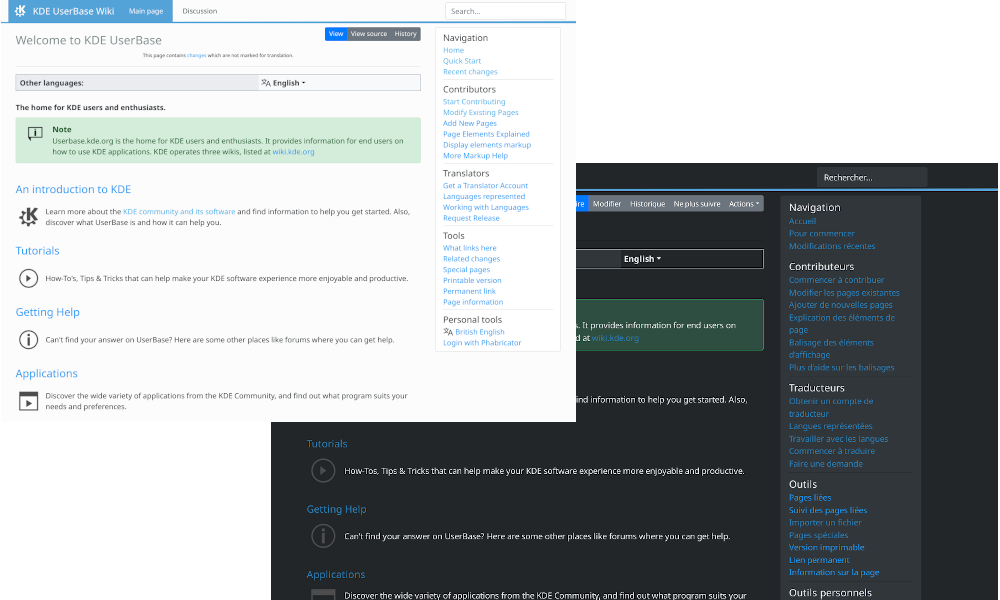
Versions of a web site in normal display mode (left) and dark mode (right)

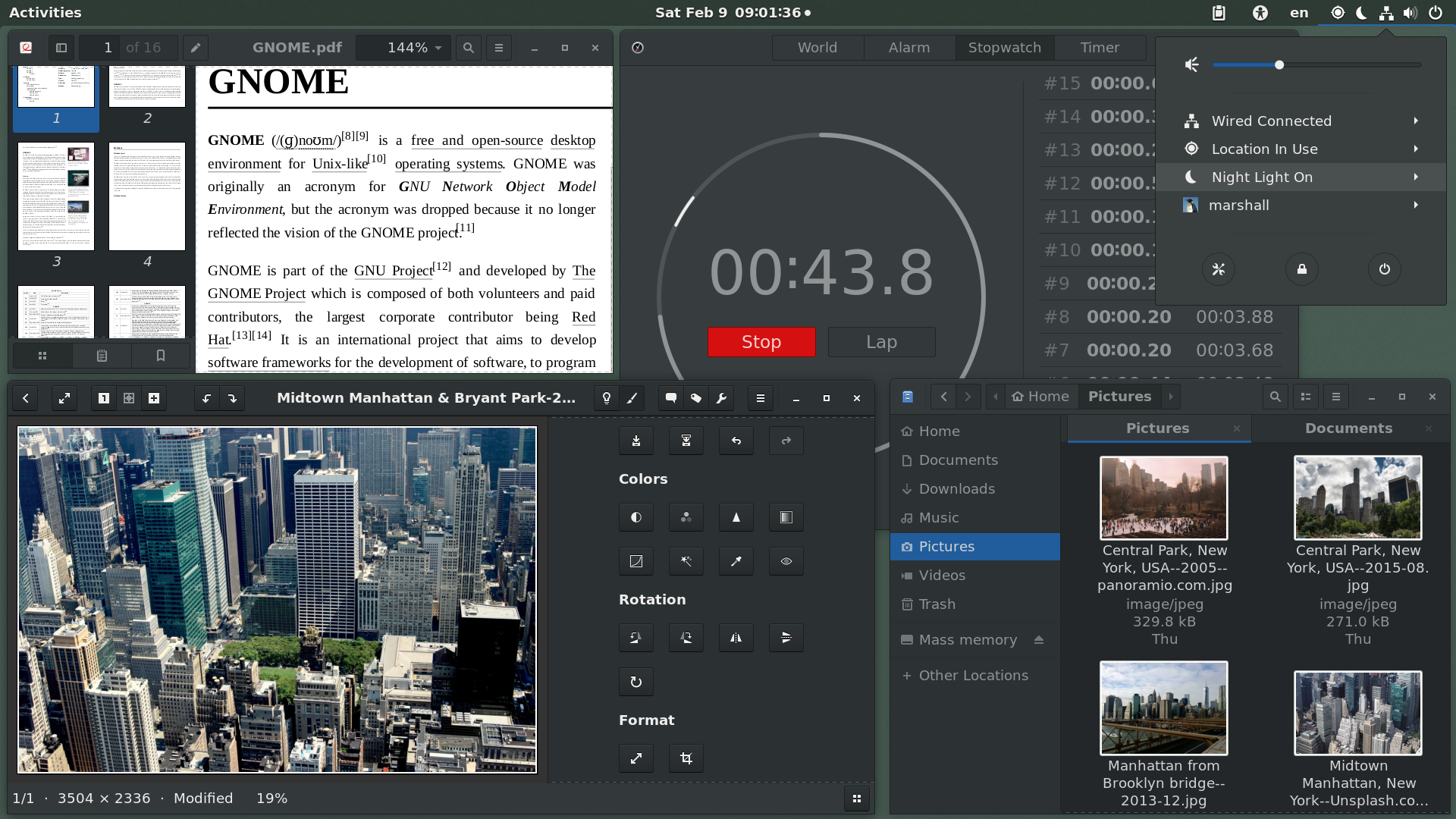
Dark theme for GNOME

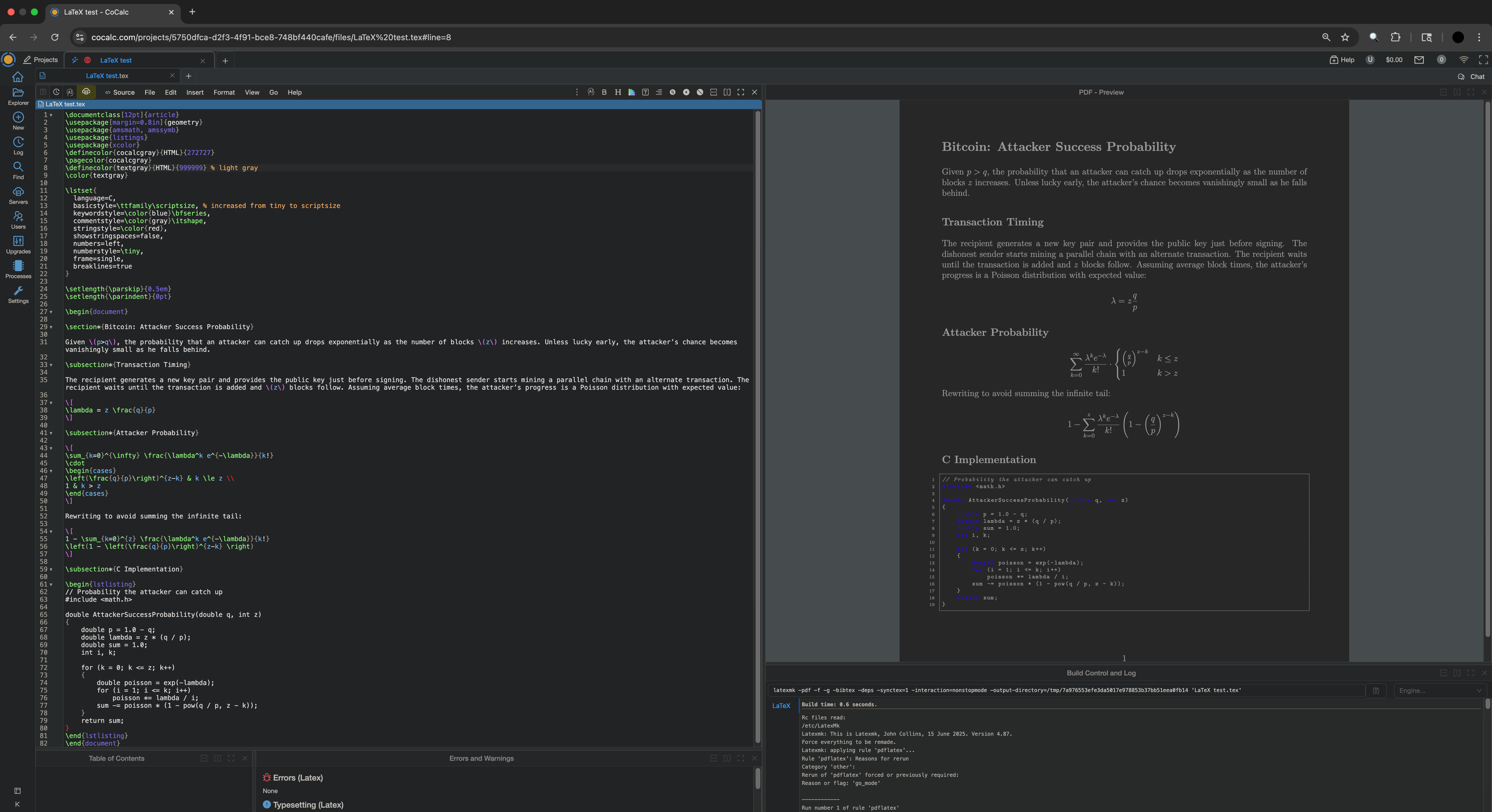
Instead of a white paper, a dark paper, made with CoCalc and the LaTeX document

A dark mode, dark theme, night mode, or light-on-dark color scheme is a color scheme that uses light-colored text, icons, and graphical user interface elements on a dark background. It is often discussed in terms of computer user interface design and web design. Many modern websites and operating systems offer the user an optional light-on-dark display mode.

Some users find dark mode displays more visually appealing, and claim that it can reduce eye strain. Displaying white at full brightness uses roughly six times as much power as pure black on a 2016 Google Pixel, which has an OLED display. However, conventional LED displays may not benefit from reduced power consumption; but if a LED display has the partial dimming features, it still benefits from reduced power consumption. Most modern operating systems support an optional light-on-dark color scheme.

== History ==
Microsoft introduced the high contrast themes in Windows 95. Later, Microsoft introduced a dark theme in the Anniversary Update of Windows 10 in 2016. In 2018, Apple followed in macOS Mojave. In September 2019, iOS 13 and Android 10 both introduced dark modes. Some operating systems provide tools to change the dark mode state automatically at sundown or sunrise. A "prefers-color-scheme" option was created for front-end web developers in 2019, being a CSS property that signals a user's choice for their system to use a light or dark color theme. Firefox and Chromium have optional dark theme for all internal screens. It is also possible for third-party developers to implement their own dark themes. There are also a variety of browser add-ons that can re-theme web sites with dark color schemes, also aligning with system theme. Wikipedia's mobile and desktop versions received a dark mode option in 2024.

== Implementation ==
There is a prefers-color-scheme media query in CSS, to detect if the user has requested light or dark color scheme and serve the requested color scheme. It can be indicated from the user's operating system preference or a user agent.

CSS example:

@media (prefers-color-scheme: dark) {
    body {
        color: #ccc;
        background: #222;
    }
}

<span style="background-color: light-dark(#fff, #333); color: light-dark(#333, #fff);"></span>

JavaScript example:

if (window.matchMedia('(prefers-color-scheme: dark)').matches) {
    dark();
}

== Energy usage ==
Light on dark color schemes require less energy to display on OLED displays. This positively impacts battery life and reduces energy consumption.

While an OLED will consume around 40% of the power of an LCD displaying an image that is primarily black, it can use more than three times as much power to display an image with a white background, such as a document or web site. This can lead to reduced battery life and higher energy usage unless a light-on-dark color scheme is used. The long-term reduced power usage may also prolong battery life or the useful life of the display and battery.

The energy savings that can be achieved using a light-on-dark color scheme are because of how OLED screens work: in an OLED screen, each subpixel generates its own light and it only consumes power when generating light. This is in contrast to how an LCD works: in an LCD, subpixels either block or allow light from an always-on (lit) LED backlight to pass through.

"AMOLED Black" color schemes (that use pure black instead of dark gray) do not necessarily save more energy than other light-on-dark color schemes that use dark gray instead of black, as the power consumption on an AMOLED screen decreases proportionately to the average brightness of the displayed pixels. Although it is true that AMOLED black does save more energy than dark gray, the additional energy savings are often negligible; AMOLED black will only give an additional energy saving of less than 1%, for instance, over the dark gray that's used in the dark theme for Google's official Android apps. In November 2018, Google confirmed that dark mode on Android saved battery life.

== Web issues ==
Some argue that a color scheme with light text on a dark background is easier to read on the screen, because the lower overall brightness causes less eyestrain, while others argue to the contrary. Some pages on the web are designed for white backgrounds; Image assets (GIF, PNG, SVG, WOFF, etc) can be used improperly causing visual artifacts if dark mode is forced (instead of designed for) with a plugin like Dark Reader.

== See also ==
- AMOLED
- Blackle
- Night Shift (software)
- Night light (Windows)
- Solarised (color scheme)
- Stylus (browser extension): can change the appearance and layout of web pages.
