= Mojeek =

Search engine

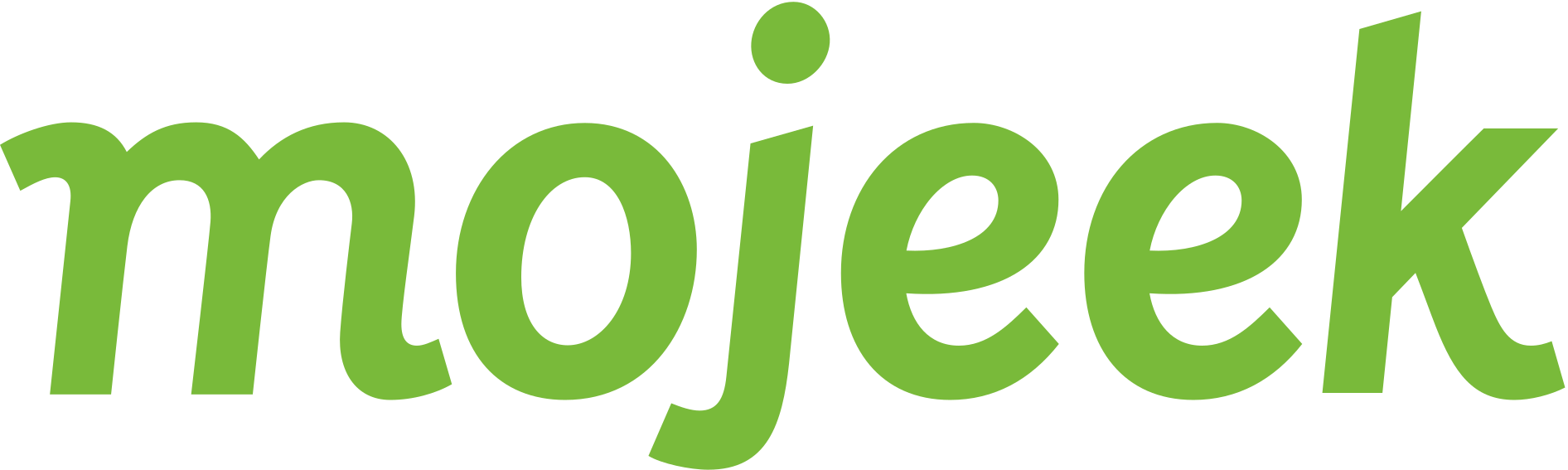

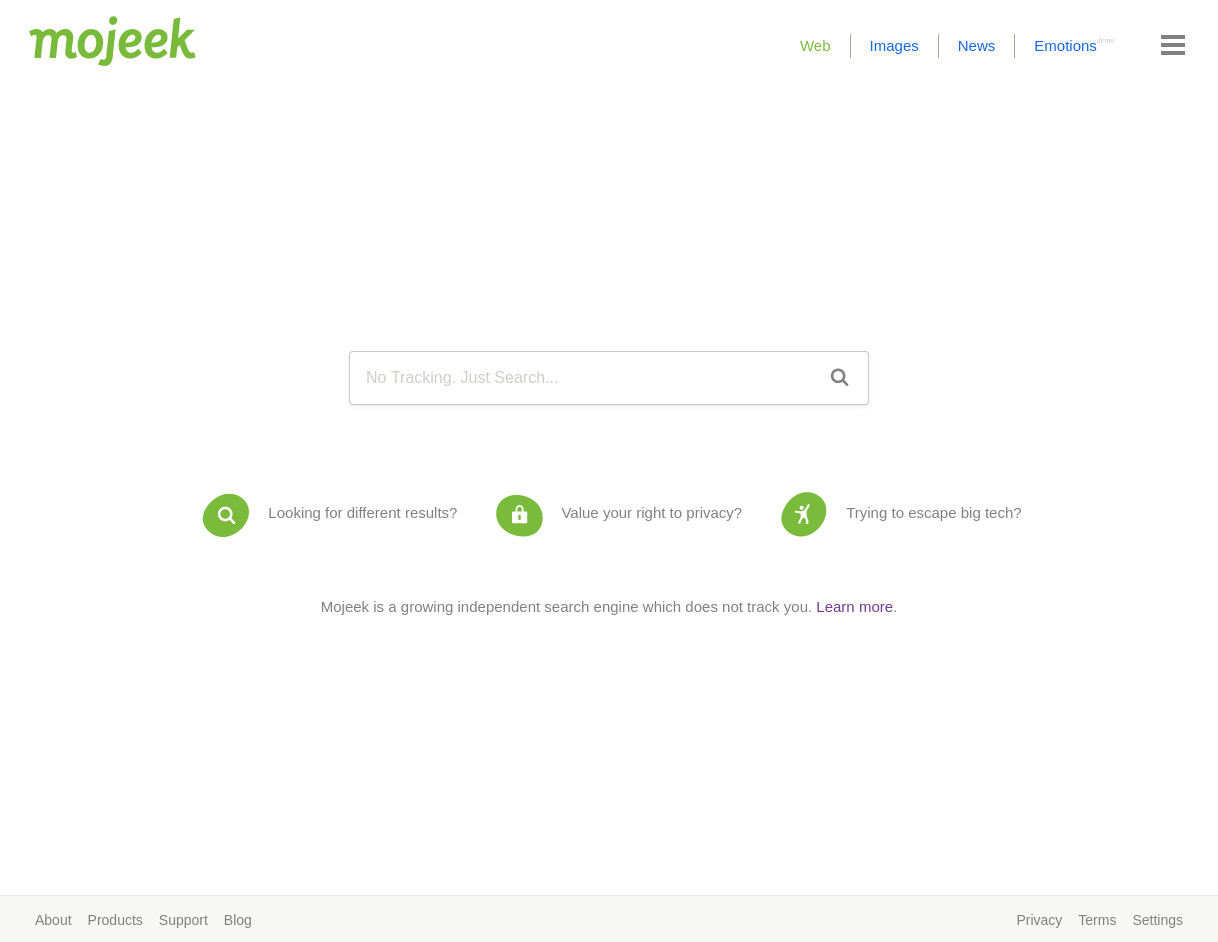
- Website type: Search engine
- Available in: English, French, German
- Headquarters: Brighton, United Kingdom
- Owner: Mojeek Limited
- Creator: Marc Smith
- Website: www.mojeek.com, www.mojeek.co.uk
- Launched: October 2004; 21 years ago
- Current status: Online
- Written in: C programming language

Mojeek (/ˈmoʊdʒiːk/ moh-jeek) is a UK-based search engine known for its focus on privacy and independence from other major search indexes. Established with a commitment to user privacy, Mojeek operates its own crawler-based index, setting it apart from search engines that rely on third-party search results, such as those from Google or Bing.

Unlike many mainstream search engines, Mojeek says it does not track, profile, or personalize search results, ensuring an unbiased and transparent search experience for its users. Founded by Marc Smith, Mojeek positions itself as a private and independent alternative to mainstream search engines.

== History ==
In 2004, the Mojeek search engine started out as a personal project by Marc Smith at the Sussex Innovation Centre. The search technology was created from the ground up using mostly the C programming language and for much of its early life, the servers were run from Smith's bedroom.

WIRED lists the launch date for Mojeek as 2006. In 2006, Mojeek became the first search engine to have a privacy policy that said ruled out user tracking. This policy remains in place as of 2025.

After receiving investment, Mojeek was officially incorporated as a limited company in 2009.

On 26 January 2011, it was highlighted as an alternative British-based search engine during a Parliamentary debate on UK internet search engines over "allegations of manipulation of Google's search results, particularly the unfavourable treatment of its unpaid and sponsored results, and the preferential placement of [their] own services."

As of 2017, Mojeek's servers are run from the Custodian data centres in Maidstone. According to Nvidia, in 2017, in partnership with EMRAYS Technologies, Mojeek launched a demo of their emotional search engine which allows users to search for pages with certain emotional content.

As of May 2019, Mojeek's index contained over 2.3 billion pages. It hit the 6 billion mark in October 2022.

Starting mid-2023, Kagi Search lists Mojeek as one of the sources for its results.

In 2024, Reddit blocked access to Mojeek and all non-Google search engines, ostensibly in hopes of improving its AI deals.

As of 2025, Mojeek has a 'summarize these results' option using open-weight Mistral to generate the summaries. uBlock Origin did not find any trackers.

== Key features ==
Mojeek is a crawler-based search engine that provides private, search results using its own index of web pages, rather than using results from other search engines. According to Jack Yan on his blog in 2022, Mojeek displayed significantly more individual entries in its search results than Google or Bing.

Mojeek can search based on emotion, returning results that match the emotion designated in the search bar.

== Search API ==
Mojeek offers a search API as of 2025.

== Etymology ==
Mojeek says that the term "mojeek" was made up and loosely based on the word 'logic'.

== See also ==
- Comparison of web search engines
- List of search engines
- List of search engines by popularity
