= Swisscows =

Web search engine operated by Hulbee AG

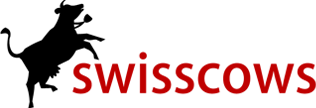

- Website type: Web search engine
- Available in: Multilingual
- Headquarters: Egnach, Arbon District, Thurgau, Switzerland
- Owner: Hulbee AG
- Creator: Andreas Wiebe
- Website: www.swisscows.com
- Launched: June 26, 2014; 12 years ago
- Current status: Online

Swisscows is a search engine launched in 2014, a project of Hulbee AG, a company based in Egnach, Switzerland.

== History ==
Swisscows was founded in 2014 by Andreas Wiebe.

As of 2018, there were 20 million monthly search queries, according to Hulbee CEO, Andreas Wiebe.

In January 2021, the company launched TeleGuard, a messaging app intended to focus on privacy and data protection.

== Operation ==
Swisscows uses semantic data recognition that gives faster answers to queries and claims to not store users' data.

Swisscows also deems itself family-friendly, with explicit results entirely omitted. The engine's servers are based in underground data centers under the Swiss Alps, and geographically outside of EU and US.

Swisscows uses Bing for web search, but has also built its own index for the German language edition. It also has shopping search, music search (powered by SoundCloud), and a language translator powered by Yandex.

== See also ==
- List of search engines
- Comparison of web search engines
