= SafeSearch =

Google's search feature

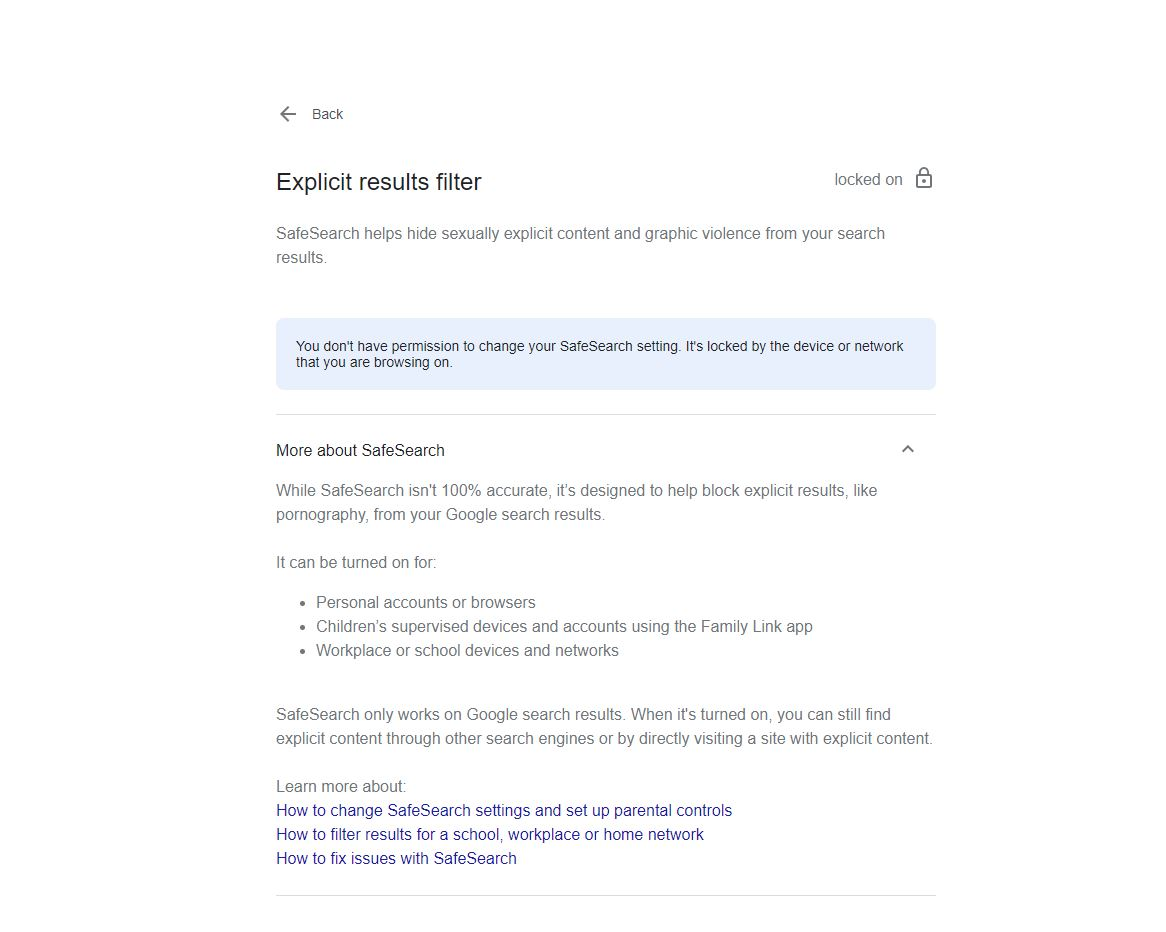
The filter for SafeSearch on Google Search

SafeSearch is a search feature on Google and Microsoft Bing. It is an automated filter of pornography, violence, gore, and other offensive or inappropriate content. It is used as a parental control setting due to the feature being, most likely, to keep children from harmful content, and can also be used for public computers or other devices.

== History ==
On November 11, 2009, Google introduced the ability for users with Google Accounts to lock on the SafeSearch level in Google's web and image searches. Once configured, a password is required to change the setting.

On December 12, 2012, Google removed the option to turn off the filter entirely, requiring users to enter more specific search queries to access adult content.

SafeSearch can be enforced by local area network administrators and ISPs by adding a DNS record. This is often done on school networks to prevent students from accessing pornographic content. Additionally, specialized child-friendly search engines like KidzSearch and Kiddle achieve strict parental control filtering by forcing all queries through Google's SafeSearch protocols.

Users themselves can turn this setting on to filter out any inappropriate content.

== Effectiveness ==
A report by Harvard Law School's Berkman Center for Internet & Society stated that SafeSearch excluded many innocuous websites from search-result listings, including ones created by the White House, IBM, the American Library Association and Liz Claiborne.

On the other hand, many pornographic images slip through the filter, even when "innocent" search terms are entered.

Blacklisting certain search terms is hindered by homographs (e.g., "beaver"), blacklisting certain URLs is rendered ineffective by the changing URLs of porn sites, and software to tag images with copious amounts of flesh tones as pornographic content is problematic because there are a variety of skin tones and pictures of babies tend to have a lot of flesh tones.

Google's ability to filter porn has been an important factor in its relationship with the People's Republic of China.

== In Iran ==
On July 11, 2022, Iranian users noticed that Google's locked SafeSearch (designed for users under 13) was enabled on their mobile Internet for all users. This feature is actually a new intelligent Internet filtering system that hijacks all DNS requests with Google addresses and even Microsoft's Bing search engine so that the returned IP from DNS is 216.239.38.120 (for Google) and 131.253.33.220 (for Bing).

Iran's Minister of Communications, Issa Zarepour, described the mandatory SafeSearch activation as a demand from families. In a poll with 41,299 votes, 88.2 percent of participants opposed mandatory SafeSearch. This seems to be the beginning of the adoption of the protection plan.

== In Indonesia ==
Enforced by August 2026, all Indonesian users noticed when Google locks SafeSearch, the results are that 'harmful content was banned (such as pornography or violence) due to the Ministry of Communications and Digital Affairs's request, but the fact that online gambling websites were whitelisted may cause controversial choice. It making permanently difficult, caused by right-wing populist regime of Indonesia
