= Comparison of search engines =

Web search engines are listed in tables below for comparison purposes. The first table lists the company behind the engine, volume and ad support and identifies the nature of the software being used as free software or proprietary software. The second and third table lists internet privacy aspects along with other technical parameters, such as whether the engine provides personalization (alternatively viewed as a filter bubble).

Defunct or acquired search engines are not listed here.

== Search crawlers ==
Current search engines with independent crawlers, as of December 2018.

Search engine	Founder(s)	Company	Launched	Software distribution license	Pages indexed	Daily direct queries	Results count	Advertisements
Ahmia	Juha Nurmi	Juha Nurmi	2014	Proprietary				
AOL	William von Meister		1999	Proprietary				
Baidu	Robin Li Yanhong	Baidu, Inc	2000	Proprietary				
Brave Search	Brendan Eich and Brian Bondy	Brave Software, Inc.	2021	Proprietary	Unknown	Unknown	No	Yes
Cốc Cốc Search	Nguyễn Thanh Bình, Lê Văn Thanh, and Nguyễn Đức Ngọc	Cốc Cốc Ltd.	2013	Proprietary			No	Yes
DuckDuckGo	Gabriel Weinberg	Duck Duck Go, Inc.	2008	Mixed				
Ecosia	Christian Kroll		2009	Proprietary			No	Yes
Exalead	François Bourdoncle and Patrice Bertin	Exalead	2000	Proprietary	Unknown	Unknown	Yes	No
Fireball	Oli Kai Paulus, Helmut Hoffer von Ankershoffen, Nurhan Yildirim, and Benhui Chen	Fireball Labs GmbH	1996	Proprietary				
Google Search	Larry Page, Sergey Brin & Scott Hassan	Alphabet Inc.	1997	Proprietary	hundreds of billions	9.022 billion	Yes	Yes
Kagi	Vladimir Prelovac	Kagi Inc.	2018	Proprietary				No
Kiddle			2014	Proprietary				
KidRex			2008	Proprietary				
Microsoft Bing		Microsoft	1998/2009	Proprietary	Unknown	Unknown	Yes	Yes
Million Short			2012					
Mojeek	Marc Smith	Mojeek	2004	Proprietary	5 billion	Unknown	Yes	Yes
Naver	Kim Sang-Hun	Naver Corp.	1999	Proprietary	Unknown	Unknown	No	Yes
Petal		Huawei	2020	Proprietary	Unknown	Unknown	Yes	Yes
Qwant	Éric Léandri	Qwant	2013	Proprietary	20 billion	10 million	No	Yes
Seznam.cz	Ivo Lukačovič		1996	Proprietary				
Sogou		Tencent	2010	Proprietary	Unknown	Unknown	Yes	Yes
Startpage		Surfboard Holding BV	1998					
Swisscows	Andreas Wiebe	Swisscows	2014	Proprietary	Unknown	Unknown	Yes	Yes
WebCrawler	Brian Pinkerton		1994	Proprietary				
Yahoo! Search	Jerry Yang & David Filo	Yahoo!	1995	Proprietary		Unknown	Yes	Yes
Yandex Search	Arkady Volozh	Yandex	1997	Proprietary	>2 billion	Unknown	Yes	Yes

== Digital rights ==
Search engine	Server's location(s)	Dedicated servers	Data center	Cloud computing	HTTPS available	Tor gateway available	Proxy gateway search links available
Ahmia					Yes	Yes	
AOL					Yes	No	
Baidu	China				Yes	No	Unknown
Blackle					No	No	
Brave Search					Yes	Yes	
Cốc Cốc Search	Vietnam				Yes	No	
DuckDuckGo	USA	No	Verizon Internet Services	Amazon EC2	Yes	Yes	
Ecosia	USA	No			Yes	No	
Exalead					No	No	
Fireball					Yes	No	
Google Search	USA	Yes	Google data centers		Yes	No	Unknown
Kagi	Multiple			Google Cloud Platform	Yes	Yes	
Kiddle					Yes	No	
KidRex					Yes	No	
Lycos					Yes	No	
Microsoft Bing	USA / China	Yes			Yes	No	Unknown
Mojeek	UK	Yes	Custodian Data Centres		Yes	No	Unknown
Naver					Yes	No	
Petal	France				Yes	No	Unknown
Qwant	France	Yes			Yes	Unknown	Unknown
Seznam.cz					Yes	No	
Sogou	China				Yes	No	Unknown
Startpage	Netherlands				Yes	Yes	
Swisscows					Yes	No	
WebCrawler					Yes	No	
Yahoo! Search	USA	Partial			Yes	No	Unknown
Yandex Search	Russia	Yes			Yes	No	Unknown

=== Tracking and surveillance ===
Search engine	HTTP tracking cookies	Personalized results (Note: The results of the search are arranged for the user in accordance to their interests as determined from previous search queries or other information available to the search engine.) (Note: Cannot be verified independently, as the information is handled by servers not accessible by the public.)	IP address tracking (Note: Tracking the user has to be conducted in order to provide personalized search results.)	Information sharing	Warrantless wiretapping of unencrypted backend traffic
Ahmia	No				
AOL	Yes				
Baidu	Yes	Unknown	Unknown	Unknown	Unknown
Blackle	No				
Brave Search	No				
Cốc Cốc Search	Yes				
DuckDuckGo	No	No	No	No	No
Ecosia	No	No	No	No	Unknown
Exalead	No				
Fireball	Yes				
Google Search	Yes	Default	Yes	Yes	2013 and prior
Kiddle	No				
KidRex	No				
Lycos	No				
Microsoft Bing	Yes	Yes	Yes	Yes	2014 and prior
Mojeek	No	No	No	No	Unknown
Naver	No				
Petal	Yes	Unknown	Unknown	Unknown	Unknown
Qwant	No	No	No	No	No
Seznam.cz	No				
Sogou	Yes	Unknown	Unknown	Unknown	Unknown
Swisscows	No				
WebCrawler	Yes				
Yahoo! Search	Yes	Unknown	Yes	Yes	2014 and prior
Yandex Search	Yes	Yes	Unknown	Limited	Unknown

== See also ==
- Comparison of webmail providers – often merged with web search engines by companies that host both services
- List of search engines
- Search engine privacy
