= Scrapy =

Python web-crawling framework

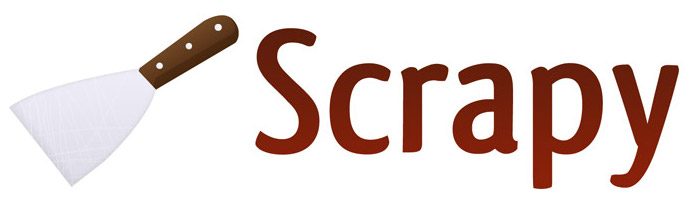
- Developer: Zyte (formerly Scrapinghub)
- Initial release: 26 June 2008
- Stable release: 2.13.4 / 17 November 2025; 40 days ago
- Repository: github.com/scrapy/scrapy
- Written in: Python
- Operating system: Windows, macOS, Linux
- Type: Web crawler
- License: BSD License
- Website: scrapy.org

Scrapy (/ˈskreɪpaɪ/ SKRAY-peye) is a free and open-source web-crawling framework written in Python. Originally designed for web scraping, it can also be used to extract data using APIs or as a general-purpose web crawler. It is currently maintained by Zyte (formerly Scrapinghub), a web-scraping development and services company.

Scrapy project architecture is built around "spiders", which are self-contained crawlers that are given a set of instructions. Following the spirit of other don't repeat yourself frameworks, such as Django, it makes it easier to build and scale large crawling projects by allowing developers to reuse their code.

Some well-known companies and products using Scrapy are: Lyst, Parse.ly, Sayone Technologies, Sciences Po Medialab, Data.gov.uk’s World Government Data site.

== History ==
Scrapy was born at London-based web-aggregation and e-commerce company Mydeco, where it was developed and maintained by employees of Mydeco and Insophia (a web-consulting company based in Montevideo, Uruguay). The first public release was in August 2008 under the BSD license, with a milestone 1.0 release happening in June 2015. In 2011, Zyte (formerly Scrapinghub) became the new official maintainer.
