= Brave Search =

Privacy-focused search engine

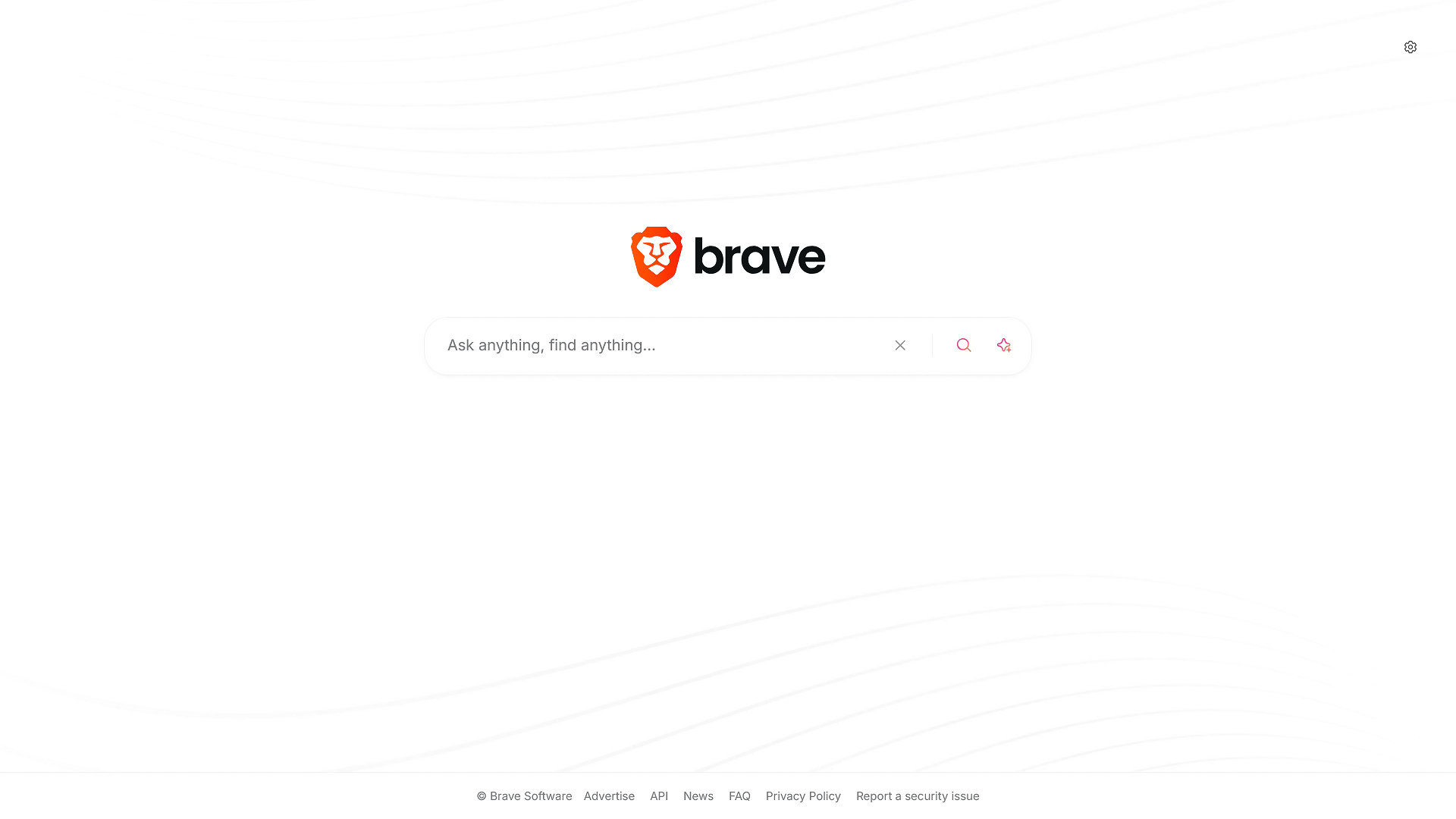
- Screenshot of Brave Search
- Former name: Tailcat
- Website type: Web search engine
- Headquarters: San Francisco, California, US
- Creators: Brave Software, Inc.
- Products: Search API
- Website: search.brave.com
- Registration: Optional
- Launched: June 2022; 4 years ago
- Current status: Online

Brave Search is a search engine developed by Brave Software, Inc., and is the default search engine for the Brave web browser in certain countries. The search engine uses its own web index to generate results.

== History ==
Brave Search was developed following the acquisition of Tailcat, a privacy-focused search engine from Cliqz, a subsidiary of Hubert Burda Media based in Germany.

In October 2021, Brave Search was made the default search engine for Brave browser users in the United States, Canada, United Kingdom (replacing Google Search), France (replacing Qwant) and Germany (replacing DuckDuckGo).

In June 2022, Brave Search ended its beta stage and was fully released along with an announcement that within its year-long beta testing period, it surpassed 2.5 billion total queries.

In August 2023, Brave created its own image and video search index so it no longer needed to rely on Bing for that 7% of its search results.

In 2024, Brave started selling ads (without using behavioral or personal data).

In September 2025, Brave search reached 1.6 billion monthly searches.

In March 2025, Brave Software sued News Corp and several of its publishing operations, seeking a declaration that its indexing and summarizing of content from publications including The Wall Street Journal and the New York Post constituted fair use. News Corp countersued in July 2026, alleging that Brave had unlawfully scraped and resold versions of its articles to artificial-intelligence companies. News Corp sought an injunction, unspecified damages and statutory damages of up to US$150,000 for each infringement; Brave maintained that its indexing, excerpts and summaries were protected by fair use.

== Features ==
Brave Search uses its own web index to generate search results with the aid of the Web Discovery Project (WDP) it launched as an opt-in feature to allow users to help it index the web.

=== Discussions ===
In 2022, Brave added the Discussions feature that shows conversations related to the search query, such on sites like Stack Exchange.

=== Goggles ===
A feature that allows users to apply their own rules and filters to a search, and share them with others. Some of the more popular filters in 2022 included one that removed copycat spam sites from search results and another called NetSec that searches a few thousand cybersecurity sites trusted by its creator, Forces Unseen. Goggles files must be created in Domain Specific Language and must stay under 10,000 instructions.

=== Rerank ===
In January 2025, Brave enabled regular users to upvote or downvote sites to further improve users' search results. It is based on Goggles but not intended as a replacement for it.

=== Search API ===
In May 2023, Brave announced that it had launched a search API. Brave Search API is an interface that allows developers to integrate search functionalities from the Brave Search engine into their applications.

=== AI ===
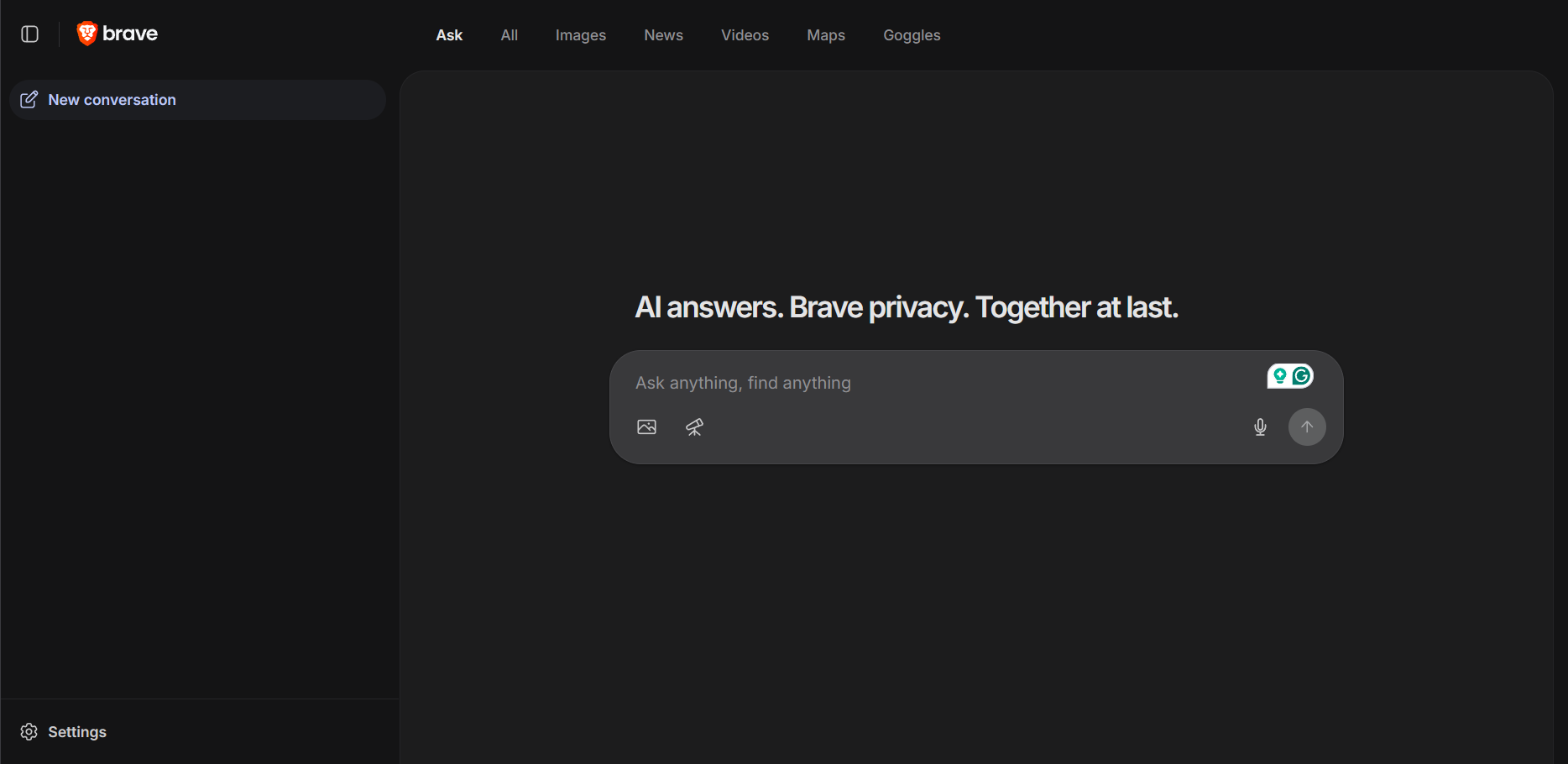
Brave Search's AI chat

A large language model can be asked to respond to some search queries and is aided by content from web pages in the search results. Summarizer was launched in 2023. It summarizes information from the web pages it searches and provides citations, and by 2025, was providing summaries for 30–40% of searches. Brave's chatbot, Leo, handled back-and-forth with users.

== Brave Search Premium ==
Brave Search Premium is a paid tier that is ad-free.

== Data collection ==
User data including IP addresses are not collected from Brave Search users by default.

== Limitations ==
According to Brave, the index was kept "intentionally smaller than that of Google or Bing" in order to help avoid spam and other low-quality content, with the disadvantage that, as of 2022, "Brave Search is not yet as good as Google in recovering long-tail queries."

== See also ==
- Comparison of search engines
- List of search engines
