= Search engine =

Software system for finding relevant information on the Web

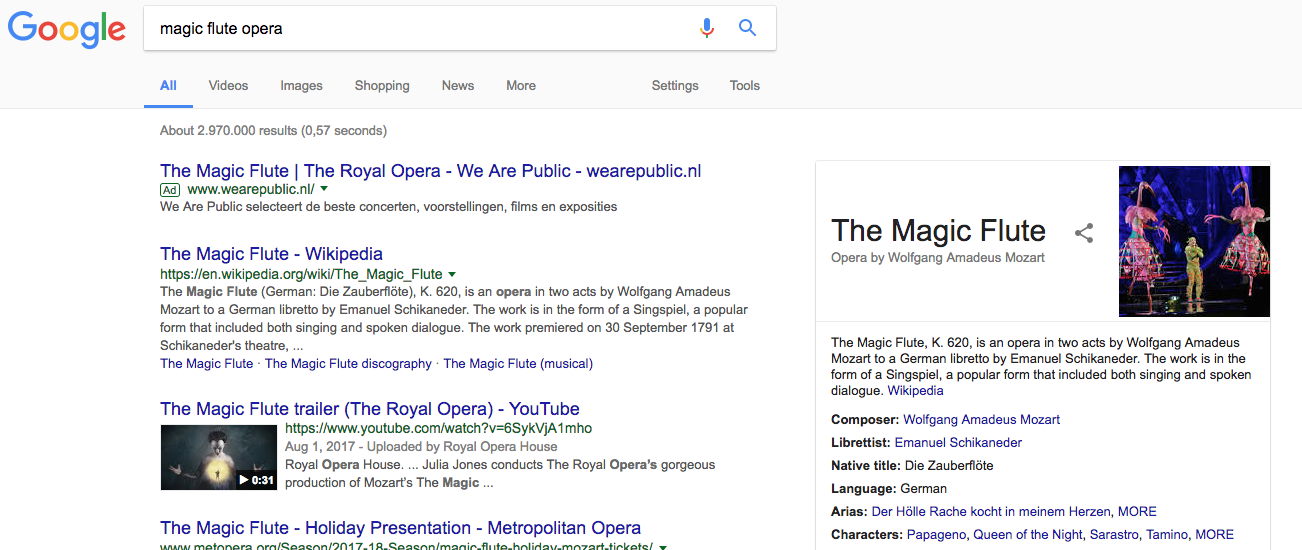
A Google search result for the phrase "magic flute opera"

A search engine is a search application that provides links to web pages and other relevant information on the Web (or the Internet in general) in response to a user's query. Users submit their queries through a web browser or a mobile app, and the results page generally displays a collection of hyperlinks together with brief descriptions and relevant images. Users also have the option of limiting a search to specific types of results, such as images, videos, or news.

For a search provider, its engine is part of a distributed computing system that can encompass many data centers throughout the world. The speed and accuracy of an engine's response to a query are based on a complex system of indexing that is continuously updated by automated web crawlers. This can include data mining the files and databases stored on web servers, although some content is not accessible to crawlers.

There have been many search engines since the dawn of the Web in the 1990s; Google Search became the dominant one in the 2000s and has remained so. As of May 2025, according to StatCounter, Google held approximately 89–90 % of the worldwide search share, with competitors trailing far behind: Bing (~4 %), Yandex (~2.5 %), Yahoo! (~1.3 %), DuckDuckGo (~0.8 %), and Baidu (~0.7 %). May 2025 marked the first time in over a decade that Google's share has fallen below the 90% threshold.

Because of its market share, the discipline of websites improving their visibility in search results, known as marketing and optimization, has historically largely focused on Google.

== History ==
Timeline (full list)
Year	Engine	Current status
1993	W3Catalog	Inactive
1993	ALIWEB	Inactive
1993	JumpStation	Inactive
1993	WWW Worm	Inactive
1994	WebCrawler	Active
1994	Go.com	Inactive, redirects to Disney
1994	Lycos	Active
1994	Infoseek	Inactive, redirects to Disney
1995	Yahoo! Search	Active, initially a search function for Yahoo! Directory
1995	Daum	Active
1995	Search.ch	Active
1995	Magellan	Inactive
1995	Excite	Active
1995	MetaCrawler	Active
1995	AltaVista	Inactive, acquired by Yahoo! in 2003, since 2013 redirects to Yahoo!
1995	SAPO	Active
1996	RankDex	Inactive, incorporated into Baidu in 2000
1996	Dogpile	Active
1996	HotBot	Inactive (used Inktomi search technology)
1996	Ask Jeeves	Inactive
1997	AOL NetFind	Active (rebranded AOL Search since 1999)
1997	goo.ne.jp	Active
1997	Northern Light	Inactive
1997	Yandex	Active
1998	Google	Active
1998	Ixquick	Active as Startpage.com
1998	MSN Search	Active as Bing
1998	empas	Inactive (merged with NATE)
1999	AlltheWeb	Inactive (URL redirected to Yahoo!)
1999	GenieKnows	Inactive, rebranded Yellowee (was redirecting to justlocalbusiness.com)
1999	Naver	Active
1999	Teoma	Inactive (redirect to Ask.com)
2000	Baidu	Active
2000	Exalead	Inactive
2000	Gigablast	Inactive
2001	Kartoo	Inactive
2003	Info.com	Active
2004	A9.com	Inactive
2004	Clusty	Active, Yippy, previously Clusty, now owns Togoda.com
2004	Mojeek	Active
2004	Sogou	Active
2005	SearchMe	Inactive
2006	Soso	Inactive, merged with Sogou
2006	Quaero	Inactive
2006	Search.com	Active
2006	ChaCha	Inactive
2006	Ask.com	Inactive
2006	Live Search	Active as Bing, rebranded MSN Search
2007	wikiseek	Inactive
2007	Sproose	Inactive
2007	Wikia Search	Inactive
2007	Blackle.com	Active, Google Search
2008	Powerset	Inactive (redirects to Bing)
2008	Picollator	Inactive
2008	Viewzi	Inactive
2008	LeapFish	Inactive
2008	Forestle	Inactive (redirects to Ecosia)
2008	DuckDuckGo	Active
2008	TinEye	Active
2009	Bing	Active, rebranded Live Search
2009	Yebol	Inactive
2009	Scout (Goby)	Active
2009	NATE	Active
2009	Ecosia	Active
2009	Startpage.com	Active, sister engine of Ixquick
2010	Blekko	Inactive, sold to IBM
2010	Cuil	Inactive
2010	Yandex (English)	Active
2010	Parsijoo	Active
2011	YaCy	Active, P2P
2012	Volunia	Inactive
2013	Qwant	Active
2014	Egerin	Active, Kurdish / Sorani
2014	Swisscows	Active
2014	Searx	Inactive
2015	Yooz	Inactive
2015	Cliqz	Inactive
2016	Kiddle	Active, Google Search
2017	Presearch	Inactive
2018	Kagi	Active
2020	Petal	Active
2021	Brave Search	Active
2021	You.com	Active
2021	SearXNG	Active, Fork of Searx
2022	Perplexity	Active

=== Pre-1990s ===
In 1945, Vannevar Bush described an information retrieval system that would allow a user to access a great expanse of information, all at a single desk, which he called a memex. He described this system in an article titled "As We May Think" in The Atlantic Monthly. The memex was intended to give a user the capability to overcome the ever-increasing difficulty of locating information in ever-growing centralized indices of scientific work. Vannevar Bush envisioned libraries of research with connected annotations, which are similar to modern hyperlinks.

Link analysis eventually became a crucial component of search engines through algorithms such as Hyper Search and PageRank.

=== 1990s: Birth of search engines ===
The first internet search engines predate the debut of the Web in December 1990: WHOIS user search dates back to 1982, and the Knowbot Information Service multi-network user search was first implemented in 1989. The first well-documented search engine that searched content files, namely FTP files, was Archie, which debuted on 10 September 1990.

Before September 1993, the World Wide Web was entirely indexed by hand. There was a list of webservers edited by Tim Berners-Lee and hosted on the CERN webserver. One snapshot of the list in 1992 remains, but as more and more web servers went online the central list could no longer keep up. On the NCSA site, new servers were announced under the title "What's New!".

The first tool used for searching content (as opposed to users) on the Internet was Archie. The name stands for "archive" without the "v". It was created by Alan Emtage, computer science student at McGill University in Montreal, Quebec, Canada. The program downloaded the directory listings of all the files located on public anonymous FTP (File Transfer Protocol) sites, creating a searchable database of file names; however, Archie Search Engine did not index the contents of these sites since the amount of data was so limited it could be readily searched manually.

The rise of Gopher (created in 1991 by Mark McCahill at the University of Minnesota) led to two new search programs, Veronica and Jughead. Like Archie, they searched the file names and titles stored in Gopher index systems. Veronica (Very Easy Rodent-Oriented Net-wide Index to Computerized Archives) provided a keyword search of most Gopher menu titles in the entire Gopher listings. Jughead (Jonzy's Universal Gopher Hierarchy Excavation And Display) was a tool for obtaining menu information from specific Gopher servers. While the name of the search engine "Archie Search Engine" was not a reference to the Archie comic book series, "Veronica" and "Jughead" are characters in the series, thus referencing their predecessor.

In the summer of 1993, no search engine existed for the web, though numerous specialized catalogs were maintained by hand. Oscar Nierstrasz at the University of Geneva wrote a series of Perl scripts that periodically mirrored these pages and rewrote them into a standard format. This formed the basis for W3Catalog, the web's first primitive search engine, released on September 2, 1993.

In June 1993, Matthew Gray, then at MIT, produced what was probably the first web robot, the Perl-based World Wide Web Wanderer, and used it to generate an index called "Wandex". The purpose of the Wanderer was to measure the size of the World Wide Web, which it did until late 1995. The web's second search engine Aliweb appeared in November 1993. Aliweb did not use a web robot, but instead depended on being notified by website administrators of the existence at each site of an index file in a particular format.

JumpStation (created in December 1993 by Jonathon Fletcher) used a web robot to find web pages and to build its index, and used a web form as the interface to its query program. It was thus the first WWW resource-discovery tool to combine the three essential features of a web search engine (crawling, indexing, and searching) as described below. Because of the limited resources available on the platform it ran on, its indexing and hence searching were limited to the titles and headings found in the web pages the crawler encountered.

One of the first "all text" crawler-based search engines was WebCrawler, which came out in 1994. Unlike its predecessors, it allowed users to search for any word in any web page, which has become the standard for all major search engines since. It was also the search engine that was widely known by the public. Also, in 1994, Lycos (which started at Carnegie Mellon University) was launched and became a major commercial endeavor.

The first popular search engine on the Web was Yahoo! Search. The first product from Yahoo!, founded by Jerry Yang and David Filo in January 1994, was a Web directory called Yahoo! Directory. In 1995, a search function was added, allowing users to search Yahoo! Directory. It became one of the most popular ways for people to find web pages of interest, but its search function operated on its web directory, rather than its full-text copies of web pages.

Soon after, a number of search engines appeared and vied for popularity. These included Magellan, Excite, Infoseek, Inktomi, Northern Light, and AltaVista. Information seekers could also browse the directory instead of doing a keyword-based search.

In 1996, Robin Li developed the RankDex site-scoring algorithm for search engines results page ranking and received a US patent for the technology. It was the first search engine that used hyperlinks to measure the quality of websites it was indexing, predating the very similar algorithm patent filed by Google two years later in 1998. Larry Page referenced Li's work in some of his U.S. patents for PageRank. Li later used his RankDex technology for the Baidu search engine, which was founded by him in China and launched in 2000.

In 1996, Netscape was looking to give a single search engine an exclusive deal as the featured search engine on Netscape's web browser. There was so much interest that instead, Netscape struck deals with five of the major search engines: for $5 million a year, each search engine would be in rotation on the Netscape search engine page. The five engines were Yahoo!, Magellan, Lycos, Infoseek, and Excite.

Google adopted the idea of selling search terms in 1998 from a small search engine company named goto.com. This move had a significant effect on the search engine business, which went from struggling to one of the most profitable businesses on the Internet.

Search engines attracted significant investments in the late 1990s. Several companies entered the market receiving record gains during their initial public offerings. Some have taken down their public search engine and are marketing enterprise-only editions, such as Northern Light. Many search engine companies were caught up in the dot-com bubble, a speculation-driven market boom that peaked in March 2000.

=== 2000s–present: Post dot-com bubble ===
Around 2000, Google's search engine rose to prominence. The company achieved better results for many searches with an algorithm called PageRank, as was explained in the paper "The Anatomy of a Large-Scale Hypertextual Web Search Engine" written by Sergey Brin and Larry Page, the later founders of Google. This iterative algorithm ranks web pages based on the number and PageRank of other web sites and pages that link there, on the premise that good or desirable pages are linked to more than others. Larry Page's patent for PageRank cites Robin Li's earlier RankDex patent as an influence. Google also maintained a minimalist interface to its search engine. In contrast, many of its competitors embedded a search engine in a web portal. In fact, the Google search engine became so popular that spoof engines emerged such as Mystery Seeker.

By 2000, Yahoo! was providing search services based on Inktomi's search engine. Yahoo! acquired Inktomi in 2002, and Overture (which owned AlltheWeb and AltaVista) in 2003. Yahoo! switched to Google's search engine until 2004, when it launched its own search engine based on the combined technologies of its acquisitions.

Microsoft first launched MSN Search in the fall of 1998 using search results from Inktomi. In early 1999, the site began to display listings from Looksmart, blended with results from Inktomi. For a short time in 1999, MSN Search used results from AltaVista instead. In 2004, Microsoft began a transition to its own search technology, powered by its own web crawler (called msnbot).

Microsoft's rebranded search engine, Bing, was launched on June 1, 2009. On July 29, 2009, Yahoo! and Microsoft finalized a deal in which Yahoo! Search would be powered by Microsoft Bing technology.

As of 2019, active search engine crawlers include those of Baidu, Bing, Brave, Google, DuckDuckGo, Gigablast, Mojeek, Sogou and Yandex.

In the 2020s, artificial intelligence-powered search engines and generative AI assistants became increasingly integrated into mainstream web search. These systems combine traditional web indexing with large language models to provide conversational responses, summaries, and contextual recommendations.

== Approach ==
A search engine maintains the following processes in near real time:

1. Web crawling
2. Indexing
3. Searching

Web search engines get their information by web crawling from site to site. The "spider" checks for the standard filename robots.txt, addressed to it. The robots.txt file contains directives for search spiders, telling it which pages to crawl and which pages not to crawl. After checking for robots.txt and either finding it or not, the spider sends certain information back to be indexed depending on many factors, such as the titles, page content, JavaScript, Cascading Style Sheets (CSS), headings, or its metadata in HTML meta tags. After a certain number of pages crawled, amount of data indexed, or time spent on the website, the spider stops crawling and moves on. "[N]o web crawler may actually crawl the entire reachable web. Due to infinite websites, spider traps, spam, and other exigencies of the real web, crawlers instead apply a crawl policy to determine when the crawling of a site should be deemed sufficient. Some websites are crawled exhaustively, while others are crawled only partially".

Indexing means associating words and other definable tokens found on web pages to their domain names and HTML-based fields. The associations are stored in a public database and accessible through web search queries. A query from a user can be a single word, multiple words or a sentence. The index helps find information relating to the query as quickly as possible. Some of the techniques for indexing, and caching are trade secrets, whereas web crawling is a straightforward process of visiting all sites on a systematic basis.

Between visits by the spider, the cached version of the page (some or all the content needed to render it) stored in the search engine working memory is quickly sent to an inquirer. If a visit is overdue, the search engine can just act as a web proxy instead. In this case, the page may differ from the search terms indexed. The cached page holds the appearance of the version whose words were previously indexed, so a cached version of a page can be useful to the website when the actual page has been lost, but this problem is also considered a mild form of linkrot.

High-level architecture of a standard Web crawler

Typically, when a user enters a query into a search engine it is a few keywords. The index already has the names of the sites containing the keywords, and these are instantly obtained from the index. The real processing load is in generating the web pages that are the search results list: Every page in the entire list must be weighted according to information in the indexes. Then the top search result item requires the lookup, reconstruction, and markup of the snippets showing the context of the keywords matched. These are only part of the processing each search results web page requires, and further pages (next to the top) require more of this post-processing.

Beyond simple keyword lookups, search engines offer their own GUI- or command-driven operators and search parameters to refine the search results. These provide the necessary controls for the user engaged in the feedback loop users create by filtering and weighting while refining the search results, given the initial pages of the first search results. For example, from 2007 the Google.com search engine has allowed one to filter by date by clicking "Show search tools" in the leftmost column of the initial search results page, and then selecting the desired date range. It is also possible to weight by date because each page has a modification time. Most search engines support the use of the Boolean operators AND, OR and NOT to help end users refine the search query. Boolean operators are for literal searches that allow the user to refine and extend the terms of the search. The engine looks for the words or phrases exactly as entered. Some search engines provide an advanced feature called proximity search, which allows users to define the distance between keywords. There is also concept-based searching where the research involves using statistical analysis on pages containing the words or phrases the user searches for.

The usefulness of a search engine depends on the relevance of the result set it gives back. While there may be millions of web pages that include a particular word or phrase, some pages may be more relevant, popular, or authoritative than others. Most search engines employ methods to rank the results to provide the "best" results first. How a search engine decides which pages are the best matches, and what order the results should be shown in, varies widely from one engine to another. The methods also change over time as Internet usage changes and new techniques evolve. There are two main types of search engine that have evolved: one is a system of predefined and hierarchically ordered keywords that humans have programmed extensively. The other is a system that generates an "inverted index" by analyzing texts it locates. This first form relies much more heavily on the computer itself to do the bulk of the work.

Most Web search engines are commercial ventures supported by advertising revenue and thus some of them allow advertisers to have their listings ranked higher in search results for a fee. Search engines that do not accept money for their search results make money by running search-related ads alongside the regular search engine results.

=== Local search ===
Local search is the process that optimizes the efforts of local businesses. They focus on ensuring consistent search results. It is important because many people determine where they plan to go and what to buy based on their searches.

== Market share ==
As of January 2022, Google is by far the world's most used search engine, with a market share of 90%, and the world's other most used search engines were Bing at 4%, Yandex at 2%, Yahoo! at 1%. Other search engines not listed have less than a 3% market share. In 2024, Google's dominance was ruled an illegal monopoly in a case brought by the US Department of Justice.

=== Russia ===
As of late 2023, search engine market shares in Russia and East Asia have remained relatively stable but with some notable shifts due to geopolitical and technological developments.

In Russia, Yandex continues to dominate the search engine market with a share of approximately 73%, while Google holds around 25%. Yandex also remains a key player in localized services including navigation, ride-hailing, and e-commerce, strengthening its ecosystem.

=== East Asia ===
In China, Baidu remains the leading search engine with a market share of about 59.3% as of early 2024. Other domestic engines such as Sogou and 360 Search hold smaller shares. Google remains inaccessible in mainland China due to long-standing censorship issues, having exited the Chinese market in 2010 following disputes over censorship and cybersecurity.

Bing, Microsoft's search engine, has maintained a niche presence in China with a market share around 13.6%, making it one of the few foreign search engines operating under local regulatory constraints.

In Japan, Google Japan currently holds the largest market share (around 76.2%), while Yahoo! Japan, operated by Z Holdings (a SoftBank and Naver joint venture), retains about 15.8% market share.

As of Kakao's merger with Daum in 2014, domestic search engines controlled almost all of the South Korean market. Naver led with a majority market share, followed by Daum. As of Kakao's spinoff of Daum in 2025, Daum's market share in the country had sunk below that of Google and Bing. Naver still held a majority of the market. Naver hosts a "vast pool of locally tailored content" from its Korean users. In July 2026, Google overtook Naver's monthly active user count in the country.

In Taiwan, Google is the predominant search engine, commanding over 93% of the market, with Yahoo! Taiwan and Bing trailing far behind.

== Search engine bias ==
Although search engines are programmed to rank websites based on some combination of their popularity and relevancy, empirical studies indicate various political, economic, and social biases in the information they provide and the underlying assumptions about the technology. These biases can be a direct result of economic and commercial processes (e.g., companies that advertise with a search engine can also become more popular in its organic search results), and political processes (e.g., the removal of search results to comply with local laws). For example, Google will not surface certain neo-Nazi websites in France and Germany, where Holocaust denial is illegal.

Biases can also be a result of social processes, as search engine algorithms are frequently designed to exclude non-normative viewpoints in favor of more "popular" results. Indexing algorithms of major search engines skew towards coverage of U.S.-based sites, rather than websites from non-U.S. countries.

Google Bombing is one example of an attempt to manipulate search results for political, social or commercial reasons.

Several scholars have studied the cultural changes triggered by search engines, and the representation of certain controversial topics in their results, such as terrorism in Ireland, climate change denial, and conspiracy theories.

== Customized results and filter bubbles ==
There has been concern raised that search engines such as Google and Bing provide customized results based on the user's activity history, leading to what has been termed echo chambers or filter bubbles by Eli Pariser in 2011. The argument is that search engines and social media platforms use algorithms to selectively guess what information a user would like to see, based on information about the user (such as location, past click behavior and search history). As a result, websites tend to show only information that agrees with the user's past viewpoint. According to Eli Pariser users get less exposure to conflicting viewpoints and are isolated intellectually in their own informational bubble. Since this problem has been identified, competing search engines have emerged that seek to avoid this problem by not tracking or "bubbling" users, such as DuckDuckGo. However many scholars have questioned Pariser's view, finding that there is little evidence for the filter bubble. On the contrary, a number of studies trying to verify the existence of filter bubbles have found only minor levels of personalization in search, that most people encounter a range of views when browsing online, and that Google news tends to promote mainstream established news outlets.

== Religious search engines ==
The global growth of the Internet and electronic media in the Arab and Muslim world during the last decade has encouraged Islamic adherents in the Middle East and Asian sub-continent, to attempt their own search engines, their own filtered search portals that would enable users to perform safe searches. More than usual safe search filters, these Islamic web portals categorize websites as either 'halal' or 'haram", based on interpretation of Sharia law. ImHalal came online in September 2011. Halalgoogling came online in July 2013. These use haram filters on the collections from Google and Bing (and others).

While a lack of investment and slow pace in technologies in the Muslim world has hindered progress and thwarted the success of an Islamic search engine, targeting as the main consumers Islamic adherents, projects like Muxlim (a Muslim lifestyle site) received millions of dollars from investors like Rite Internet Ventures, and it also faltered. Other religion-oriented search engines are Jewogle, the Jewish version of Google, and Christian search engine SeekFind.org. SeekFind filters sites that attack or degrade their faith.

== Search engine submission ==
Web search engine submission is a process in which a webmaster submits a website directly to a search engine. While search engine submission is sometimes presented as a way to promote a website, it generally is not necessary because the major search engines use web crawlers that will eventually find most websites on the Internet without assistance. They can either submit one web page at a time, or they can submit the entire site using a sitemap, but it is normally only necessary to submit the home page of a website as search engines can crawl a well-designed website. There are two remaining reasons to submit a website or web page to a search engine: to add an entirely new website without waiting for a search engine to discover it, and to have a website's record updated after a substantial redesign.

Some search engine submission software not only submits websites to multiple search engines, but also adds links to websites from their own pages. This could appear helpful in increasing a website's ranking, because external links are one of the most important factors determining a website's ranking. However, John Mueller of Google has stated that this "can lead to a tremendous number of unnatural links for your site" with a negative impact on site ranking.

== Comparison to social bookmarking ==
In comparison to search engines, a social bookmarking system has several advantages over traditional automated resource location and classification software, such as search engine spiders. All tag-based classification of Internet resources (such as web sites) is done by human beings, who understand the content of the resource, as opposed to software, which algorithmically attempts to determine the meaning and quality of a resource. Also, people can find and bookmark web pages that have not yet been noticed or indexed by web spiders. Additionally, a social bookmarking system can rank a resource based on how many times it has been bookmarked by users, which may be a more useful metric for end-users than systems that rank resources based on the number of external links pointing to it. However, both types of ranking are vulnerable to fraud, (see Gaming the system), and both need technical countermeasures to try to deal with this.

== Technology ==
=== Archie ===
The first web search engine was Archie, created in 1990 by Alan Emtage, a student at McGill University in Montreal.

The primary method of storing and retrieving files was via the File Transfer Protocol (FTP), a communication protocol specifying a common way for computers to exchange files over the Internet. It works like this: an administrator decides that they want to make files available from their computer. They set up a program on their computer, called an FTP server. When someone on the Internet wants to retrieve a file from this computer, they connect to it via another program called an FTP client. Any FTP client program can connect with any FTP server program as long as the client and server programs both fully follow the specifications set forth in the FTP protocol.

Initially, anyone who wanted to share a file had to set up an FTP server in order to make the file available to others. Later, "anonymous" FTP sites became repositories for files, allowing all users to post and retrieve them.

Even with archive sites, many important files were still scattered on small FTP servers. These files could be located only by the Internet equivalent of word of mouth: Somebody would post an e-mail to a message list or a discussion forum announcing the availability of a file.

Archie changed all that. It combined a script-based data gatherer, which fetched site listings of anonymous FTP files, with a regular expression matcher for retrieving file names matching a user query. (4) In other words, Archie's gatherer scoured FTP sites across the Internet and indexed all of the files it found. Its regular expression matcher provided users with access to its database.

=== Veronica ===
In 1993, the University of Nevada System Computing Services group developed Veronica. It was created as a type of searching device similar to Archie but for Gopher files. Another Gopher search service, called Jughead, appeared a little later, probably for the sole purpose of rounding out the comic-strip triumvirate. Jughead is an acronym for Jonzy's Universal Gopher Hierarchy Excavation and Display, although, like Veronica, it is probably safe to assume that the creator backed into the acronym. Jughead's functionality was almost identical to Veronica's, although it appears to be a little rougher around the edges.

=== The Lone Wanderer ===
The World Wide Web Wanderer, developed by Matthew Gray in 1993 was the first robot on the Web and was designed to track the Web's growth. Initially, the Wanderer counted only Web servers, but shortly after its introduction, it started to capture URLs as it went along. The database of captured URLs became the Wandex, the first web database.

Matthew Gray's Wanderer created quite a controversy at the time, partially because early versions of the software ran rampant through the Net and caused a noticeable netwide performance degradation. This degradation occurred because the Wanderer would access the same page hundreds of times a day. The Wanderer soon amended its ways, but the controversy over whether robots were good or bad for the Internet remained.

In response to the Wanderer, Martijn Koster created Archie-Like Indexing of the Web, or ALIWEB, in October 1993. As the name implies, ALIWEB was the HTTP equivalent of Archie, and because of this, it is still unique in many ways.

ALIWEB does not have a web-searching robot. Instead, webmasters of participating sites post their own index information for each page they want listed. The advantage to this method is that users get to describe their own site, and a robot does not run about eating up Net bandwidth. The disadvantages of ALIWEB became more pronounced over time. The primary disadvantage is that a special indexing file must be submitted. Most users do not understand how to create such a file, and therefore they do not submit their pages. This leads to a relatively small database, which means that users are less likely to search ALIWEB than one of the large bot-based sites. This Catch-22 has been somewhat offset by incorporating other databases into the ALIWEB search, but it still did not have the mass appeal of search engines such as Yahoo! or Lycos, which dominated the mid-1990s search landscape.

=== Excite ===
Excite, initially called Architext, was started by six Stanford undergraduates in February 1993. Their idea was to use statistical analysis of word relationships in order to provide more efficient searches through the large amount of information on the Internet. Their project was fully funded by mid-1993. Once funding was secured. they released a version of their search software for webmasters to use on their own websites. At the time, the software was called Architext, but it now goes by the name of Excite for Web Servers.

Excite was the first serious commercial search engine which launched in 1995. It was developed at Stanford and was purchased for $6.5 billion by @Home. In 2001 Excite and @Home went bankrupt and InfoSpace bought Excite for $10 million.

Some of the first analysis of web searching was conducted on search logs from Excite

=== Yahoo! ===
In April 1994, two Stanford University PhD candidates, David Filo and Jerry Yang, created some pages that became relatively popular. They called the collection of pages Yahoo! Their official explanation for the name choice was that they considered themselves to be a pair of yahoos.

As the number of links grew and their pages began to receive thousands of hits a day, the team created ways to better organize the data. In order to aid in data retrieval, Yahoo! (www.yahoo.com) became a searchable directory. The search feature was a simple database search engine. Because Yahoo! entries were entered and categorized manually, Yahoo! was not really classified as a search engine. Instead, it was generally considered to be a searchable directory. Yahoo! has since automated some aspects of the gathering and classification process, blurring the distinction between engine and directory.

The Wanderer captured only URLs, which made it difficult to find things that were not explicitly described by their URL. Because URLs are rather cryptic to begin with, this did not help the average user. Searching Yahoo! or the Galaxy was much more effective because they contained additional descriptive information about the indexed sites.

=== Lycos ===
At Carnegie Mellon University during July 1994, Michael Mauldin, on leave from CMU, developed the Lycos search engine.

=== Types of web search engines ===
Search engines on the web are sites enriched with a facility to search the content stored on other sites. There is a difference in the way various search engines work, but they all perform three basic tasks.

1. Finding and selecting full or partial content based on the keywords provided.
2. Maintaining an index of the content and referencing the location they find
3. Allowing users to look for words or combinations of words found in that index.

The process begins when a user enters a query statement into the system through the interface provided.

Type	Example	Description
Conventional	librarycatalog	Search by keyword, title, author, etc.
Text-based	Google, Bing, Yahoo!	Search by keywords. Limited search using queries in natural language.
Voice-based	Google, Bing, Yahoo!	Search by keywords. Limited search using queries in natural language.
Multimedia search	QBIC, WebSeek, SaFe	Search by visual appearance (shapes, colors,..)
Q/A	Stack Exchange, NSIR	Search in (restricted) natural language
Clustering Systems	Vivisimo, Clusty, Togoda	
Research Systems	Lemur, Nutch	

There are basically three types of search engines: Those that are powered by robots (called crawlers; ants or spiders), those that are powered by human submissions, and those that are a hybrid of the two.

Crawler-based search engines are those that use automated software agents (called crawlers) that visit a Web site, read the information on the actual site, read the site's meta tags and also follow the links that the site connects to performing indexing on all linked Web sites as well. The crawler returns all that information to a central depository, where the data is indexed. The crawler will periodically return to the sites to check for any information that has changed. The frequency with which this happens is determined by the administrators of the search engine.

Human-powered search engines rely on humans to submit information that is subsequently indexed and catalogued. Only information that is submitted is put into the index.

In both cases, when a user queries a search engine to locate information, they're actually searching through the index that the search engine has created —they are not actually searching the Web. These indices are giant databases of information that is collected and stored and subsequently searched. This explains why sometimes a search on a commercial search engine, such as Yahoo! or Google, will return results that are, in fact, dead links. Since the search results are based on the index, if the index has not been updated since a Web page became invalid the search engine treats the page as still an active link even though it no longer is. It will remain that way until the index is updated.

Different search engines produce different results, partially because of differences in indices, which depend on what the spiders find or what the humans submitted. But more importantly, not every search engine uses the same algorithm to search through the indices. The algorithm is what the search engines use to determine the relevance of the information in the index to what the user is searching for.

One of the elements that a search engine algorithm scans for is the frequency and location of keywords on a Web page. Those with higher frequency are typically considered more relevant. But search engine technology is becoming sophisticated in its attempt to discourage what is known as keyword stuffing, or spamdexing.

Another common element that algorithms analyze is the way that pages link to other pages in the Web. By analyzing how pages link to each other, an engine can both determine what a page is about (if the keywords of the linked pages are similar to the keywords on the original page) and whether that page is considered "important" and deserving of a boost in ranking. Just as the technology is becoming increasingly sophisticated to ignore keyword stuffing, it is also becoming more savvy to Web masters who build artificial links into their sites in order to build an artificial ranking.

Modern web search engines are highly intricate software systems that employ technology that has evolved over the years. There are a number of sub-categories of search engine software that are separately applicable to specific 'browsing' needs. These include web search engines (e.g. Google), database or structured data search engines (e.g. Dieselpoint), and mixed search engines or enterprise search. The more prevalent search engines, such as Google and Yahoo!, utilize hundreds of thousands of computers to process trillions of web pages in order to return fairly well-aimed results. Due to this high volume of queries and text processing, the software is required to run in a highly dispersed environment with a high degree of redundancy.

Another category of search engines is scientific search engines. These are search engines that search scientific literature. The most prominent example is Google Scholar. Researchers are working on improving search engine technology by making them understand the content elements of the articles, such as extracting theoretical constructs or key research findings.

== See also ==
- Comparison of search engines
- Content moderation
- Google effect
- Use of web search engines in libraries
- List of search engines
- List of academic databases and search engines
- Question answering
- Search engine privacy
- Semantic Web
- Spell checker
- Timeline of web search engines
- Web development tools
- Web query
- Wikipedia:Search engine test, for a tutorial on using search engines for researching Wikipedia articles
