= 9 Algorithms That Changed the Future =

2012 book by John MacCormick

9 Algorithms that Changed the Future - The Ingenious Ideas that Drive Today's Computers
- Author: John MacCormick
- Subject: Algorithm
- Publisher: Princeton University Press
- Publication date: 2012
- Publication place: United States
- Pages: 232
- ISBN: 978-0691158198
- Website: "9 Algorithms that Changed the Future". Archived from the original on 2017-09-04.

9 Algorithms that Changed the Future is a 2012 book by John MacCormick on algorithms. The book seeks to explain commonly encountered computer algorithms to a layman audience.

== Summary ==
The chapters in the book each cover an algorithm.

1. Search engine indexing
2. PageRank
3. Public-key cryptography
4. Forward error correction
5. Pattern recognition
6. Data compression
7. Database
8. Digital signature

== Response ==
One reviewer said the book is written in a clear and simple style.

A reviewer for New York Journal of Books suggested that this book would be a good complement to an introductory college-level computer science course.

Another reviewer called the book "a valuable addition to the popular computing literature".

== 2020 edition ==
The book has been re-released by Princeton University Press in 2020.
