= Concept Searching Limited =

Software company in United Kingdom

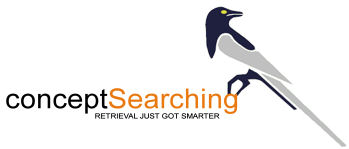
- Company type: Private
- Industry: Information retrieval
- Founded: 2002
- Headquarters: UK, United States
- Area served: Global
- Products: conceptClassifier Platform conceptSearch conceptClassifier conceptClassifier for SharePoint conceptClassifier for SharePoint Online; Taxonomy Manager; Taxonomy Workflow
- Website: www.conceptsearching.com

Concept Searching Limited was a software company that specialized in information retrieval software. It created products for enterprise search, taxonomy management, and statistical classification.

== History ==
Concept Searching was founded in 2002 in the UK with offices in the USA and South Africa. In August 2003, the company introduced the idea of using compound term processing.

The company's products ran on the Microsoft .NET platform. The products integrated with Microsoft SharePoint and many other platforms.

Concept Searching developed the Smart Content Framework, a toolset that provides an enterprise framework to mitigate risk, automate processes, manage information, protect privacy, and address compliance issues. The Smart Content Framework was used by many large organizations including 23,000 users at the NASA Safety Center.

Concept Searching was acquired by Netwrix on 28 November 2018.

== See also ==
- Compound term processing
- Enterprise search
- Full text search
- Information retrieval
- Concept search
