= Stumpers =

Stumpers may refer to:

- An Internet resource containing searchable archives for the Stumpers-L listserv
- Stumpers!, a game show similar to Password, hosted by Allen Ludden from October to December 1976 on NBC
