= Infodata Systems =

Infodata Systems, Inc. was a software development and database manufacturer based in Northern Virginia and founded in 1968.

Infodata developed a database system from the early 1970s to the late 1990s. The Infodata database program, Inquire, was well regarded and widely used in the 1970s and 1980s. Inquire was one of the first "text" databases and used for publication storage, litigation support, and other text intense problems.

Infodata's Inquire was a fully functional DBMS. It included an easy-to-use but non-SQL, query language. The basic architecture was "inverted list", not relational.

As other vendors entered the market, Infodata's market share eroded. By 1990, investors felt the company's performance was declining. In the 1990s, Infodata branched out and became a consulting firm as well, specializing in Enterprise Content Management systems, primarily Documentum. They also developed their own content management system, called Virtual File Cabinet, which was a document-sharing solution for the enterprise intranet. In 2001, they created an integration between Adobe Acrobat and Documentum for use in annotating documents called AnnoDoc.

In 2005, Infodata sold its Acrobat related products (AnnoDoc, Compose, and Signet) to Image Solutions and was acquired by McDonald Bradley.
