= Proximity search =

Proximity search may refer to:

- Proximity search (text)
- Proximity search (metric space)
