= Concept search =

Automated information retrieval method

A concept search (or conceptual search) is an automated information retrieval method that is used to search electronically stored unstructured text (for example, digital archives, email, scientific literature, etc.) for information that is conceptually similar to the information provided in a search query. In other words, the ideas expressed in the information retrieved in response to a concept search query are relevant to the ideas contained in the text of the query.

== Development ==
Concept search techniques were developed because of limitations imposed by classical Boolean keyword search technologies when dealing with large, unstructured digital collections of text. Keyword searches often return results that include many non-relevant items (false positives) or that exclude too many relevant items (false negatives) because of the effects of synonymy and polysemy. Synonymy means that one of two or more words in the same language have the same meaning, and polysemy means that many individual words have more than one meaning.

Polysemy is a major obstacle for all computer systems that attempt to deal with human language. In English, the most frequently used terms have several common meanings. For example, the word fire can mean: a combustion activity; to terminate employment; to launch, or to excite (as in fire up). For the 200 most-polysemous terms in English, the typical verb has more than twelve common meanings, or senses. The typical noun from this set has more than eight common senses. For the 2000 most-polysemous terms in English, the typical verb has more than eight common senses and the typical noun has more than five.

In addition to the problems of polysemous and synonymy, keyword searches can exclude inadvertently misspelled words as well as the variations on the stems (or roots) of words (for example, strike vs. striking). Keyword searches are also susceptible to errors introduced by optical character recognition (OCR) scanning processes, which can introduce random errors into the text of documents (often referred to as noisy text) during the scanning process.

A concept search can overcome these challenges by employing word sense disambiguation (WSD), and other techniques, to help it derive the actual meanings of the words, and their underlying concepts, rather than by simply matching character strings like keyword search technologies.

== Approaches ==
In general, information retrieval research and technology can be divided into two broad categories: semantic and statistical. Information retrieval systems that fall into the semantic category will attempt to implement some degree of syntactic and semantic analysis of the natural language text that a human user would provide (also see computational linguistics). Systems that fall into the statistical category will find results based on statistical measures of how closely they match the query. However, systems in the semantic category also often rely on statistical methods to help them find and retrieve information.

Efforts to provide information retrieval systems with semantic processing capabilities have basically used three approaches:

- Auxiliary structures
- Local co-occurrence statistics
- Transform techniques (particularly matrix decompositions)

=== Auxiliary structures ===
A variety of techniques based on artificial intelligence (AI) and natural language processing (NLP) have been applied to semantic processing, and most of them have relied on the use of auxiliary structures such as controlled vocabularies and ontologies. Controlled vocabularies (dictionaries and thesauri), and ontologies allow broader terms, narrower terms, and related terms to be incorporated into queries. Controlled vocabularies are one way to overcome some of the most severe constraints of Boolean keyword queries. Over the years, additional auxiliary structures of general interest, such as the large synonym sets of WordNet, have been constructed. It was shown that concept search that is based on auxiliary structures, such as WordNet, can be efficiently implemented by reusing retrieval models and data structures of classical information retrieval. Later approaches have implemented grammar to expand the range of semantic constructs. The creation of data models that represent sets of concepts within a specific domain (domain ontologies), and which can incorporate the relationships among terms, has also been implemented in recent years.

Handcrafted controlled vocabularies contribute to the efficiency and comprehensiveness of information retrieval and related text analysis operations, but they work best when topics are narrowly defined and the terminology is standardized. Controlled vocabularies require extensive human input and oversight to keep up with the rapid evolution of language. They also are not well suited to the growing volumes of unstructured text covering an unlimited number of topics and containing thousands of unique terms because new terms and topics need to be constantly introduced. Controlled vocabularies are also prone to capturing a particular worldview at a specific point in time, which makes them difficult to modify if concepts in a certain topic area change.

=== Local co-occurrence statistics ===
Information retrieval systems incorporating this approach counts the number of times that groups of terms appear together (co-occur) within a sliding window of terms or sentences (for example, ± 5 sentences or ± 50 words) within a document. It is based on the idea that words that occur together in similar contexts have similar meanings. It is local in the sense that the sliding window of terms and sentences used to determine the co-occurrence of terms is relatively small.

This approach is simple, but it captures only a small portion of the semantic information contained in a collection of text. At the most basic level, numerous experiments have shown that approximately only a quarter of the information contained in text is local in nature. In addition, to be most effective, this method requires prior knowledge about the content of the text, which can be difficult with large, unstructured document collections.

=== Transform techniques ===
Some of the most powerful approaches to semantic processing are based on the use of mathematical transform techniques. Matrix decomposition techniques have been the most successful. Some widely used matrix decomposition techniques include the following:

- Independent component analysis
- Semi-discrete decomposition
- Non-negative matrix factorization
- Singular value decomposition

Matrix decomposition techniques are data-driven, which avoids many of the drawbacks associated with auxiliary structures. They are also global in nature, which means they are capable of much more robust information extraction and representation of semantic information than techniques based on local co-occurrence statistics.

Independent component analysis is a technique that creates sparse representations in an automated fashion, and the semi-discrete and non-negative matrix approaches sacrifice accuracy of representation in order to reduce computational complexity.

Singular value decomposition (SVD) was first applied to text at Bell Labs in the late 1980s. It was used as the foundation for a technique called latent semantic indexing (LSI) because of its ability to find the semantic meaning that is latent in a collection of text. At first, the SVD was slow to be adopted because of the resource requirements needed to work with large datasets. However, the use of LSI has significantly expanded in recent years as earlier challenges in scalability and performance have been overcome. and even open sourced. LSI is being used in a variety of information retrieval and text processing applications, although its primary application has been for concept searching and automated document categorization.

== Uses ==
- eDiscovery – Concept-based search technologies are increasingly being used for Electronic Document Discovery (EDD or eDiscovery) to help enterprises prepare for litigation. In eDiscovery, the ability to cluster, categorize, and search large collections of unstructured text on a conceptual basis is much more efficient than traditional linear review techniques. Concept-based searching is becoming accepted as a reliable and efficient search method that is more likely to produce relevant results than keyword or Boolean searches.
- Enterprise Search and Enterprise Content Management (ECM) – Concept search technologies are being widely used in enterprise search. As the volume of information within the enterprise grows, the ability to cluster, categorize, and search large collections of unstructured text on a conceptual basis has become essential. In 2004 the Gartner Group estimated that professionals spend 30 percent of their time searching, retrieving, and managing information. The research company IDC found that a 2,000-employee corporation can save up to $30 million per year by reducing the time employees spend trying to find information and duplicating existing documents.
- Content-based image retrieval (CBIR) – Content-based approaches are being used for the semantic retrieval of digitized images and video from large visual corpora. One of the earliest content-based image retrieval systems to address the semantic problem was the ImageScape search engine. In this system, the user could make direct queries for multiple visual objects such as sky, trees, water, etc. using spatially positioned icons in a WWW index containing more than ten million images and videos using keyframes. The system used information theory to determine the best features for minimizing uncertainty in the classification. The semantic gap is often mentioned in regard to CBIR. The semantic gap refers to the gap between the information that can be extracted from visual data and the interpretation that the same data have for a user in a given situation. The ACM SIGMM Workshop on Multimedia Information Retrieval is dedicated to studies of CBIR.
- Multimedia and publishing – Concept search is used by the multimedia and publishing industries to provide users with access to news, technical information, and subject matter expertise coming from a variety of unstructured sources. Content-based methods for multimedia information retrieval (MIR) have become especially important when text annotations are missing or incomplete.
- Digital libraries and archives – Images, videos, music, and text items in digital libraries and digital archives are being made accessible to large groups of users (especially on the Web) through the use of concept search techniques. For example, the Executive Daily Brief (EDB), a business information monitoring and alerting product developed by EBSCO Publishing, uses concept search technology to provide corporate end users with access to a digital library containing a wide array of business content. In a similar manner, the Music Genome Project spawned Pandora, which employs concept searching to spontaneously create individual music libraries or virtual radio stations.
- Genomic Information Retrieval (GIR) – Genomic Information Retrieval (GIR) uses concept search techniques applied to genomic literature databases to overcome the ambiguities of scientific literature.
- Human resources staffing and recruiting – Many human resources staffing and recruiting organizations have adopted concept search technologies to produce highly relevant resume search results that provide more accurate and relevant candidate resumes than loosely related keyword results.

== Effective searching ==
The effectiveness of a concept search can depend on a variety of elements including the dataset being searched and the search engine that is used to process queries and display results. However, most concept search engines work best for certain kinds of queries:

- Effective queries are composed of enough text to adequately convey the intended concepts. Effective queries may include full sentences, paragraphs, or even entire documents. Queries composed of just a few words are not as likely to return the most relevant results.
- Effective queries do not include concepts in a query that are not the object of the search. Including too many unrelated concepts in a query can negatively affect the relevancy of the result items. For example, searching for information about boating on the Mississippi River would be more likely to return relevant results than a search for boating on the Mississippi River on a rainy day in the middle of the summer in 1967.
- Effective queries are expressed in a full-text, natural language style similar in style to the documents being searched. For example, using queries composed of excerpts from an introductory science textbook would not be as effective for concept searching if the dataset being searched is made up of advanced, college-level science texts. Substantial queries that better represent the overall concepts, styles, and language of the items for which the query is being conducted are generally more effective.

As with all search strategies, experienced searchers generally refine their queries through multiple searches, starting with an initial seed query to obtain conceptually relevant results that can then be used to compose and/or refine additional queries for increasingly more relevant results. Depending on the search engine, using query concepts found in result documents can be as easy as selecting a document and performing a find similar function. Changing a query by adding terms and concepts to improve result relevance is called query expansion. The use of ontologies such as WordNet has been studied to expand queries with conceptually-related words.

== Relevance feedback ==
Relevance feedback is a feature that helps users determine if the results returned for their queries meet their information needs. In other words, relevance is assessed relative to an information need, not a query. A document is relevant if it addresses the stated information need, not because it just happens to contain all the words in the query. It is a way to involve users in the retrieval process in order to improve the final result set. Users can refine their queries based on their initial results to improve the quality of their final results.

In general, concept search relevance refers to the degree of similarity between the concepts expressed in the query and the concepts contained in the results returned for the query. The more similar the concepts in the results are to the concepts contained in the query, the more relevant the results are considered to be. Results are usually ranked and sorted by relevance so that the most relevant results are at the top of the list of results and the least relevant results are at the bottom of the list.

Relevance feedback has been shown to be very effective at improving the relevance of results. A concept search decreases the risk of missing important result items because all of the items that are related to the concepts in the query will be returned whether or not they contain the same words used in the query.

Ranking will continue to be a part of any modern information retrieval system. However, the problems of heterogeneous data, scale, and non-traditional discourse types reflected in the text, along with the fact that search engines will increasingly be integrated components of complex information management processes, not just stand-alone systems, will require new kinds of system responses to a query. For example, one of the problems with ranked lists is that they might not reveal relations that exist among some of the result items.

== Guidelines for evaluating a concept search engine ==
1. Result items should be relevant to the information need expressed by the concepts contained in the query statements, even if the terminology used by the result items is different from the terminology used in the query.
2. Result items should be sorted and ranked by relevance.
3. Relevant result items should be quickly located and displayed. Even complex queries should return relevant results fairly quickly.
4. Query length should be non-fixed, i.e., a query can be as long as deemed necessary. A sentence, a paragraph, or even an entire document can be submitted as a query.
5. A concept query should not require any special or complex syntax. The concepts contained in the query can be clearly and prominently expressed without using any special rules.
6. Combined queries using concepts, keywords, and metadata should be allowed.
7. Relevant portions of result items should be usable as query text simply by selecting the item and telling the search engine to find similar items.
8. Query-ready indexes should be created relatively quickly.
9. The search engine should be capable of performing federated searches. Federated searching enables concept queries to be used for simultaneously searching multiple datasources for information, which is then merged, sorted, and displayed in the results.
10. A concept search should not be affected by misspelled words, typographical errors, or OCR scanning errors in either the query text or in the text of the data set being searched.

== Conferences and forums ==
Formalized search engine evaluation has been ongoing for many years. For example, the Text REtrieval Conference (TREC) was started in 1992 to support research within the information retrieval community by providing the infrastructure necessary for large-scale evaluation of text retrieval methodologies. Most of today's commercial search engines include technology first developed in TREC.

In 1997, a Japanese counterpart of TREC was launched, called National Institute of Informatics Test Collection for IR Systems (NTCIR). NTCIR conducts a series of evaluation workshops for research in information retrieval, question answering, automatic summarization, etc. A European series of workshops called the Cross-Language Evaluation Forum (CLEF) was started in 2001 to aid research in multilingual information access. In 2002, the Initiative for the Evaluation of XML Retrieval (INEX) was established for the evaluation of content-oriented XML retrieval systems.

Precision and recall have been two of the traditional performance measures for evaluating information retrieval systems. Precision is the fraction of the retrieved result documents that are relevant to the user's information need. The recall is defined as the fraction of relevant documents in the entire collection that are returned as result documents.

Although the workshops and publicly available test collections used for search engine testing and evaluation have provided substantial insights into how information is managed and retrieved, the field has only scratched the surface of the challenges people and organizations face in finding, managing, and, using information now that so much information is available. Scientific data about how people use the information tools available to them today is still incomplete because experimental research methodologies haven't been able to keep up with the rapid pace of change. Many challenges, such as contextualized search, personal information management, information integration, and task support, still need to be addressed.

== See also ==
- Approximate string matching
- Compound-term processing
- Concept mining
- Information extraction
- Latent semantic analysis
- Semantic network
- Semantic search
- Semantic Web
- Statistical semantics
- Text mining
