= -gry puzzle =

Word puzzle

The -gry puzzle is a popular word puzzle that asks for the third English word that ends with the letters -gry other than angry and hungry. Specific wording varies substantially, but the puzzle has no clear answer, as there are no other common English words that end in -gry. Interpretations of the puzzle suggest it is either an answerless hoax; a trick question; a sincere question asking for an obscure word; or a corruption of a more straightforward puzzle, which may have asked for words containing gry (such as gryphon). Of these, countless trick question variants and obscure English words (or nonce words) have been proposed. The lack of a conclusive answer has ensured the enduring popularity of the puzzle, and it has become one of the most frequently asked word puzzles.

The ultimate origin and original form of the puzzle is unknown, but it was popularized in 1975, starting in the New York area, and has remained popular into the 21st century. Various similar puzzles exist, though these have straightforward answers. The most notable is "words ending in -dous", which has been popular since the 1880s.

== Answers ==
Various proposed answers exist, stating that the question is one of the following:

- A hoax – there is no answer, and its purpose (or effect) is to frustrate.
- A trick question, with various answers depending on precise wording.
- A sincere question asking for an obscure word, most often proposed as aggry or puggry. This does not apply to wordings that explicitly ask for a very common word.
- A corruption of a more straightforward word puzzle, namely a word containing the sequence "gry", though not necessarily at the (tail) end, in which case the answer is gryphon which is uncommon but in use.

This topic is a source of lively interest, both to lovers of word puzzles and lovers of words. For both groups, much of the appeal lies in the quest, either to trace the origin of the puzzle or compile a complete list of words ending in -gry.

More recently, the word hangry—a portmanteau of 'hungry' and 'angry'—has been used to refer to an irritable state induced by lack of food. Oxford Dictionaries (controlled by, but less restrictive than, the Oxford English Dictionary) added hangry on 27 August 2015, and the full Oxford English Dictionary added hangry in 2018.

== History ==
There are anecdotal reports of various forms of the puzzle dating to the 1950s or earlier; the ultimate origin is presumably an oral tradition or a lost book of puzzles. However, the first documented evidence is from early 1975 in the New York metropolitan area, and the puzzle rapidly gained popularity in this year. The most likely source is the talk show of Bob Grant, from some program in early or mid March 1975.

Merriam-Webster, publishers of the leading American dictionaries, first heard of this puzzle in a letter dated March 17, 1975, from Patricia Lasker of Brooklyn, New York. Lasker says her plant manager heard the question on an unnamed quiz show. Since that time Merriam-Webster has received about four letters each year asking the question.

The puzzle first appears in print in Anita Richterman's "Problem Line" column in Newsday on April 29, 1975. One "M.Z." from Wantagh, New York states that the problem was asked on a TV quiz program. Richterman states that she asked a learned professor of English for help when she first received the inquiry, and he did not respond for over a month. This agrees with the Merriam-Webster report, suggesting a quiz show in early or mid March 1975.

In Anita Richterman's column on May 9, 1975, several correspondents reported that they had heard the puzzle on the Bob Grant radio talk show on WMCA in New York City. This suggests either that the earlier claims of a (TV) quiz show confused a talk show with a quiz show, or that there was another unspecified quiz show that was then repeated by Grant. The majority of readers gave the answer "gry", an obsolete unit of measure invented by John Locke. It is unclear whether this was the answer given on the Grant show, or what the precise wording had been.

By fall 1975, the puzzle had reached the Delaware Valley, again apparently by radio, by which time, the puzzle seems to have mutated to a form in which the missing word is an adjective that describes the state of the world.

The puzzle has had occasional bouts of popularity: after its initial popularity in 1975, it was popular in 1978, then again in 1995–1996.

=== Reports of earlier versions ===
The most credible report of an early version was given on Stumpers-L in 1999, which reported a trick question formulation from a book of riddles entitled Things to Think About, probably dating to the 1940s:

Talk about serendipity. New neighbor was up in her attic, and found a few pages of a book ... "Things to Think About" ... it was just 8 pages, and they were from the middle. They were all more or less riddles.

"Someone offers to give you 5 cents if you can jump across the street. Take it or leave it? What do you think?" next page, "Take it. Walk across the street and jump."

"Do you think you could bite 2 inches from the mantle? After you think about it, turn the page", next page "Of course you can, get a yard stick, and measure two inches away from the mantle and bite!"

"How many pieces of string would you need to fly a kite to the moon? Think a minute!" next page "Only one, but it would have to be a long one!"

AND THE LAST ONE ...

"There are three words in the English language that end with 'gry'. Two of these are angry and hungry. The third word is a very common word, and you use it often. If you have read what I have told you, you will see that I have given you the third word. What is the third word? Think very carefully." next page "Three, the question has nothing to do with angry, hungry, or any of the many other obscure words that end in 'gry', it is a simple question asking you what the third word in the sentance is. As you take tests, remember this."

I have no idea who the author was, or the publisher. From the paper, it would guess it was from the 40s, as it looks like WW2 type paper. Connie

== Alternative versions ==
=== Trick versions ===
1. This version only works when spoken: There are three words in English that end in a "gree". The first two are "angry" and "hungry", and if you've listened closely, you'll agree that I've already told you the third one.
  - The answer is "agree".
2. There are three words in the English language that end with the letters 'g', 'r', and 'y'. Two are "hungry" and "angry". The third word is something everyone uses every day. Everyone knows what the third word means. What is the third word?
  - The answer is "energy". The riddle says that the word ends in the letters g-r-y; it says nothing about the order of the letters. Many words end with "-rgy", but energy is something everyone uses every day.
3. There are at least three words in the English language that end in "g" or "y". One of them is "hungry", and another one is "angry". There is a third word, a short one, which you probably say every day. If you are listening carefully to everything I say, you just heard me say it three times. What is it?
  - The answer is "say". This version depends upon the listener confusing the spoken word "or" and the spoken letter "r".
4. There are three words in the English language that end in "gry". Two words that end in "gry" are "hungry" and "angry". Everyone knows what the third word means, and everyone uses them every day. If you listened very carefully, I have already stated to you what the third word is. The three words that solve this riddle are...?
  - The answer is the three-word sentence "I am hungry". This version asks for three words that end in "gry", not three words each of which ends in "gry".
5. I know two words that end in "gry". Neither one is angry or hungry. What are they?
  - The answer is "angry" and "hungry". Since these are words, they are not capable of being angry or hungry.
6. Give me three English words, commonly spoken, ending in g-r-y.
  - There are many possible answers, such as "Beg for mercy", or "Bring your money".
7. There are three words in the English language that end g-r-y. One is angry and another is hungry. The third word is something that "everyone" uses. If you have listened carefully, I have already told you what it is.
  - The answer is "every". First word is "fuming" which ends with "g". The word "fuming" is angry (when personified). Second word is "eager" which ends with "r". The word "eager" is hungry (when personified). Third word is "every" which ends with "y". The word "everyone" uses the word "every".

=== Meta-puzzle versions ===
The remaining versions are a form of meta-puzzle, in the sense that they make no use of the actual letters "gry" themselves, which therefore are a red herring. The red herring only works because there is another puzzle that does use these letters (even though that puzzle has no good answer).

1. Think of words ending in "gry". "Angry" and "hungry" are two of them. There are only three words in "the English language". What is the third word? Hint: The word is something that everyone uses every day. If you have listened carefully, I have already told you what it is.
  - The answer is "language", and the logic is as follows: There are only three words in "the English language"; the third word is "language". Since this version requires quotation marks around the phrase, "the English language", the written version gives away the trick.
2. Angry and hungry are two words in the English language that end in "gry". "What" is the third word. The word is something that everyone uses every day. If you have listened carefully, I have already told you what it is.
  - The answer is "what". But again, the quotation marks spoil the puzzle when it is printed.
3. There are three words in the English language that end with "gry". Two of these are "angry" and "hungry". The third word is a very common word, and you use it often. If you have read what I have told you, you will see that I have given you the third word. What is the third word? Think very carefully.
  - The answer is "three", the third word in the paragraph. The rest of the paragraph is a red herring.
4. There are three words in the English language that end in "gry". The first "one" is "hungry", the second "one" is "angry", what is the third "one"? If you have read this carefully I have given a clue.
  - The answer is the word "one", which is the third "one". Again the quotation marks ruin the written puzzle, so this version is usually written without the quotation marks and with the word "one" capitalized.

== Similar puzzles ==
There are numerous similar puzzles, giving letter sequences that rarely occur in words. The most-notable of these is the -dous puzzle of finding words ending in -dous, which was popular in the 1880s. This took various forms, sometimes simply listing all words or all common words, sometimes being posed as a riddle, giving the three common words, tremendous, stupendous, and hazardous, and requesting the rarer fourth, which is jeopardous. This form originated in 1883, with an A.A. of Glasgow writing to George Augustus Henry Sala in his "Echoes of the Week" column in the Illustrated London News. This question has had enduring popularity, even inspiring a contest, though the words have proven less stable: today jeopardous is considered too rare, and the formerly unpopular horrendous has taken its place; this change occurred as early as 1909. At times, other words such as hybridous have been accepted. Today hazardous is typically the omitted word, and differs from the others in being a visible compound hazard + -ous. This puzzle has continued in popularity through the end of the 20th century, with recent versions giving it as an alternative to the gry puzzle. There is a Russian puzzle which goes: "There are three words in the Russian language which end in -zo. Two of them are zhelezo "iron" and puzo "belly". What is the third word?" There is quite a handful of other nouns that end in -zo, in the Russian language, but most of them are fairly obscure terms like авизо, abbreviations or proper names like Кензо. Another similar one is words ending in -cion, of which the common words are coercion, scion, and suspicion.

The most similar to the gry puzzle in form is to find three words that contain the letter sequence shion, to which the answer is cushion, fashion, and parishioner; this is typically stated by giving cushion and fashion, and requesting the third word, namely parishioner. This can be modified to finding words ending with -shion, in which case the answer is the obsolete word parishion, which is a synonymous variant of parishioner. This has not been nearly as popular as the gry puzzle.

== Solution techniques ==
The standard way to solve such puzzles is to use a reverse dictionary, or to perform an exhaustive search through a dictionary, either manually, which is tedious and error-prone, or using computer tools such as grep, which requires an electronic word list. At the origin of the gry puzzle, the standard reverse dictionary in modern English was the "Air Force Reverse Dictionary" (formally the Normal and Reverse Word List, compiled under the direction of A. F. Brown), which did not have additional answers for gry. The most plausible answer at the time was meagry, found in the Oxford English Dictionary. A more elaborate strategy is to list words that have endings similar to gry, such as -gary, and then search a larger dictionary for obsolete variants ending in -gry, for example begry for beggary.

From around 1980 electronic word lists became widely available on Unix systems, and searching for answers to the gry puzzle was an occasional benchmark; this also turned up gryphon in some cases, if match is not required to be at the end. This is now easily done in milliseconds on modern personal computers:

grep gry$ /usr/share/dict/words  # Search for words ending in gry
grep gry /usr/share/dict/words  # Search for words containing gry

This usually turns up results with prefixes (e.g., overangry, powerhungry) and the aforementioned more obscure words (e.g., aggry and puggry).
