= Netwrix =

American software company

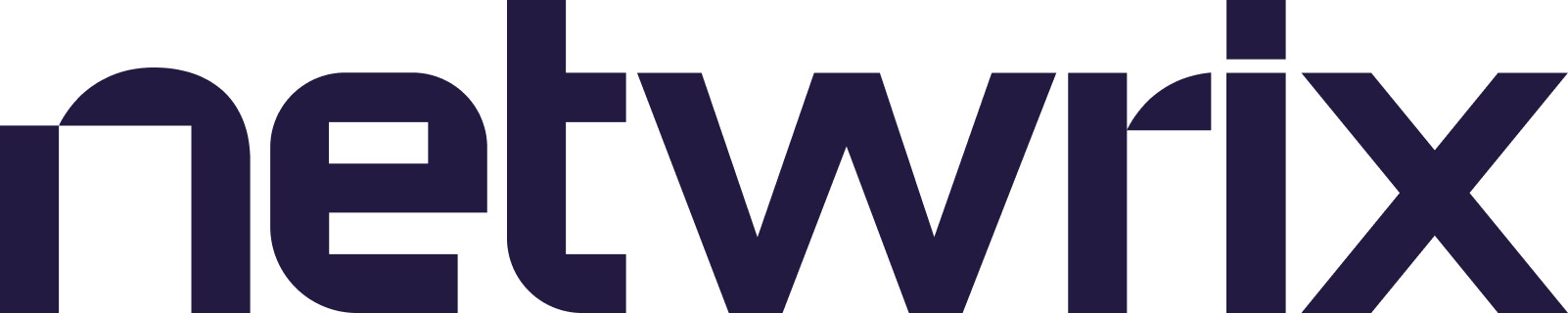
- Type: Private
- Industry: IT Software
- Founded: 2006
- Founder: Mike Walters; Alex Vovk
- Headquarters: Frisco, Texas
- Area served: United States, EMEA, Asia Pacific
- Key people: Grady Summers, CEO; Britt Norwood, CRO; John Kightly, CMO; Jacob Yavil, President and CFO
- Website: netwrix.com

Netwrix is a Frisco, Texas–based private IT security software company. After eight acquisitions the company's team geographically expanded to Latin America, UK, Germany, France, Asia, US as well as other countries. The company's flagship products are Netwrix Auditor and Netwrix Enterprise Auditor that help information security and governance professionals manage sensitive, regulated and business-critical data.

The company operates in the United States, EMEA and Asia-Pacific.

== History ==
Netwrix was founded by Mike Walters and Alex Vovk in Russia in 2006. In 2007, Netwrix released its first product, change auditing software for Active Directory. This software was subsequently folded into the company’s Change Reporter Suite, which was later renamed Netwrix Auditor. In 2011, Netwrix released its SCOM Management Pack for Change Reporter Suite, which integrates Netwrix’s auditing solutions with Microsoft System Center.

The company released a new version of Active Directory Change Reporter in November 2012. In June 2013, the company renamed its flagship product, Netwrix Change Reporter, Netwrix Auditor. On 7 February 2017 Netwrix secured Series A financing from Washington, DC–based Updata Partners.

On 5 April 2018 Steve Dickson was appointed as Chief Executive Officer by the company's Board of Directors. Steve Dickson replaced Mike Walters, previous CEO and co-founder and Alex Vovk, President and co-founder. On 28 November 2018 Netwrix acquired Concept Searching Limited. In August 2019, Netwrix formed a strategic partnership with Mott MacDonald, a UK-based consultancy, to offer data classification technology to clients. In October 2020, Netwrix received a majority investment from TA Associates.

On 4 January 2021 Netwrix merged with Stealthbits Technologies Inc. Stealthbits provided data security and privacy solutions. In February 2021, Netwrix acquired Strongpoint, a compliance, change management, and access management solution for Salesforce and NetSuite. On 16 June 2021, Netwrix acquired New Net Technologies (NNT), provider of software for change, configuration, vulnerability and asset management. On 24 March 2021, Netwrix acquired ANIXIS, a provider of software to enforce password policies. Netwrix acquired PolicyPak in October 2021. PolicyPak delivered security software to manage on-prem and remote Windows 10 desktops.

In August 2022, Netwrix acquired USERCUBE, a France-based software developer of identity governance and administration solutions. In September 2022, Netwrix acquired MATESO, a software manufacturer based in Germany that develops an enterprise password management solution. In November, 2022, Netwrix acquired IMANAMI, US-based software company that specializes in Identity and Access management solutions for Microsoft on-prem and cloud based active directory. In December, 2022, Netwrix acquired Remediant, a US-based software developer of a privileged access management solution that focuses on discovering and removing always-available administrative access.

In February, 2024, Netwrix acquired CoSoSys, a US-based software developer of a data loss prevention solution for endpoints. In August 2024, Netwrix acquired PingCastle, a software company based in France that develops Active Directory discovery and assessment tools. On 14 October 2024, Steve Dickson's CEO role was transitioned to Grady Summers. Steve Dickson remained on the Board of Directors of Netwrix.

In April 2025, Netwrix became the first data security company to launch an MCP (Model Context Protocol) server, introducing agentic AI capabilities to cybersecurity operations. The free, open-source integration with Netwrix Access Analyzer allows AI assistants like Claude and Microsoft Copilot to query security data using natural language. This enables security teams to instantly assess sensitive data exposure, user access risks, and stale accounts—without writing queries or navigating dashboards. The release positions Netwrix at the forefront of conversational cybersecurity tools, with future MCP support planned for Privilege Secure and Threat Manager.

== Partnerships ==
Netwrix is a partner of Microsoft, VMware, EMC,NetApp and HP ArcSight.
