= Walhello =

Walhello was a spider based search engine developed in the Netherlands. The Walhello spider is called "appie".

The Walhello search engine was created in 2000. Walhello's claims to have indexed over 2 billion pages, significantly less than larger search engines such as Google or Yahoo. An advanced search option proximity search functionality was provided, allowing users to define the proximity in which all search items must be found on a website. Walhello also allowed users to specify the language in which search results must be found.

The search engine ran on a cluster of Linux servers, and is programmed in C. Walhello also provided an advertising service. The search engine had a small second index which contained only paid listings, and are shown beside search results if they match the search query.
