= Reverse dictionary =

Dictionary organized in a non-standard order

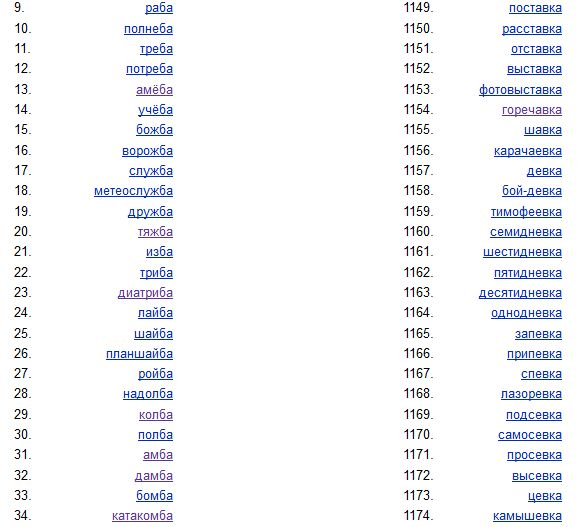
Excerpt from a reverse dictionary of the Russian language (Wiktionary)

A reverse dictionary is a dictionary alphabetized by the reversal of each entry:

stock (kcots)
diestock (kcotseid)
restock (kcotser)
livestock (kcotsevil)

Before computers, reverse dictionaries were tedious to produce. The first computer-produced was Stahl and Scavnicky's A Reverse Dictionary of the Spanish Language, in 1974. The first computer-produced reverse dictionary for a single text was Wisbey, R., Vollständige Verskonkordanz zur Wiener Genesis. Mit einem rückläufigen Wörterbuch zum Formenbestand, Berlin, E. Schmidt, 1967.

== Definition ==
In a reverse word dictionary, the entries are alphabetized by the last letter first, then next to last, and so on. In them, words with the same suffix appear together. This can be useful for linguists and poets looking for words ending with a particular suffix, or by an epigrapher or forensics specialist examining a damaged text (e.g. a stone inscription, or a burned document) that had only the final portion of a word. Reverse dictionaries of this type have been published for most major alphabetical languages.

== Applications ==
Applications of reverse word dictionaries include:

- Simple rhyming dictionaries, to the extent that spelling predicts pronunciation.
- Finding words with a given suffix (i.e., meaningful ending), like -ment.
- Finding words with the same ending as a given word, even if the sequence is not meaningful.
- Setting or solving word puzzles, such as -gry or the earlier -dous puzzle (find words ending in some way), or crossword puzzles.

== Construction ==
Reverse word dictionaries are straightforward to construct, by simply sorting based on reversed words. This was labor-intensive and tedious before computers, but is now straightforward. By the same token, reverse dictionaries have become less important since online word lists can be searched dynamically.

== Examples ==
=== English ===
==== Physical ====
- Normal and Reverse Word List. Compiled under the direction of A. F. Brown at the University of Pennsylvania, under a contract with the Air Force Office of Scientific Research (AF 49 [638]-1042) Department of Linguistics, Philadelphia, 1963.
- Lehnert, Martin, Rückläufiges Wörterbuch der englischen Gegenwartssprache, VEB Verlag Enzyklopädie, Leipzig, 1971.
- McGovern, Una, Chambers back-words for crosswords: a reverse-sorted list, Chambers, Edinburgh, 2002
- Muthmann, Gustav, Reverse English dictionary: based on phonological and morphological principles, Mouton de Gruyter, New York, 1999.
- Walker, John, The rhyming dictionary of the English language: in which the whole language is arranged according to its terminations, Routledge & Kegan Paul, London, 1983.

=== Other Languages ===
==== Akkadian ====
- Hecker, Karl, Rückläufiges Wörterbuch des Akkadischen, Harrassowitz, Wiesbaden, 1990.

==== Albanian ====
- Snoj, Marko, Rückläufiges Wörterbuch der albanischen Sprache, Buske Verlag, Hamburg, 1994.

==== Czech ====
- Těšitelová, Marie; Petr, Jan; Králík, Jan. Retrográdní slovník současné češtiny, Praha, Academia, 1986.

==== Dutch ====
- Nieuwborg, E.R., Retrograde woordenboek van de Nederlandse taal, Kluwer Technische Boeken, Deventer, 1978.

==== Estonian ====
- Hinderling, Robert, Rückläufiges estnisches Wörterbuch = Eesti keele pöördsõnaraamat (Sõnalõpuline leksikon) = Reverse dictionary of the Estonian language, Sprach- und Literaturwissenschaftliche Fakultät der Universität Bayreuth, Bayreuth, 1979.

==== Finnish ====
- Tuomi, Tuomo (ed.), Suomen kielen käänteissanakirja – Reverse Dictionary of Modern Standard Finnish, Suomalaisen kirjallisuuden seura, 1980. ISBN 951-717-002-5.

==== French ====
- Juilland, A., Dictionnaire inverse de la langue française, Mouton, The Hague, 1965.

==== German ====
- Bruckner, T., Rückläufige Wortliste zum heutigen Deutsch, Institut für Deutsche Sprache, Mannheim, 1986.
- Mater, Erich, Rückläufiges Wörterbuch der deutschen Gegenwartssprache CD-ROM, Straelener Ms.-Verlag, Straelen, 2001 ISBN 3-89107-047-0
- Muthmann, Gustav, Rückläufiges deutsches Wörterbuch: Handbuch der Wortausgänge im Deutschen, mit Beachtung der Wort- und Lautstruktur, Niemeyer, Tübingen, 2001.

==== Cypriot-Greek ====
- Συμεωνίδης, Χ. Π., Αντίστροφο λεξικό της κυπριακής διαλέκτου. Ετυμολογικό λεξικό της κυπριακής διαλέκτου. Πρώτο μέρος. Τα δυσπρόσιτα της κυπριακής διαλέκτου, 2017

==== Greek, modern ====
- Αναστασιάδη-Συμεωνίδη, Α. Αντίστροφο Λεξικό της Νέας Ελληνικής. Θεσσαλονίκη: Ινστιτούτο Νεοελληνικών Σπουδών, 2002.
- Κουρμούλης Γ. Αντίστροφον λεξικόν της Νέας Ελληνικής. Δεύτερη Έκδοση. Αθήνα: Παπαδήμας, 2002.
- Τσιλογιάννης, Παύλος, Αντίστροφο λεξικό της νέας - αρχαίας Ελληνικής γλώσσας : με διάγραμμα ιστορίας της Ελληνικής γλώσσας και χρήσιμους πίνακες, 2000 (modern and ancient Greek)
- Μπαλαφούτης, Ευάγγελος, Αντίστροφο λεξικό της κοινής νεοελληνικής γλώσσας, 1996
- Reverse dictionary in modern Greek, Βικιλεξικό (Greek Wiktionary)

==== Greek, ancient ====
- P. Kretchmer, E. Locker. Rückläufiges Wörterbuch der griechischen Sprache. Göttingen, 1944. 2nd ed. 1963
- C.D. Buck, W. Petersen. A Reverse Index of Greek Nouns and Adjectives. Chicago 1948 (?). Reprinted 1975
- F. Dornseiff, B. Hansen. Rückläufiges Wörterbuch der griechischen Eigennamen / Reverse-Lexicon of Greek Proper-Names. Berlin, 1957; Chicago 1978
- Τσιλογιάννης, Παύλος, Αντίστροφο λεξικό της νέας - αρχαίας Ελληνικής γλώσσας : με διάγραμμα ιστορίας της Ελληνικής γλώσσας και χρήσιμους πίνακες, 2000 (ancient and modern Greek)
- ΛΟΓΕΙΟΝ: Dictionaries for ancient Greek and Latin, University of Chicago. (in every page / for every lemma, there is an index which can be either forward or reverse)
- Reverse dictionary in ancient Greek, Βικιλεξικό (Greek Wiktionary)

==== Hebrew ====
- Kuhn, Karl Georg, Rückläufiges hebräisches Wörterbuch, Vandenhoeck & Ruprecht, Göttingen, 1958

==== Hebrew and Aramaic ====
- Sander, Ruth and Kerstin Mayerhofer, Retrograde Hebrew and Aramaic dictionary, Vandenhoeck & Ruprecht, Göttingen, 2010. ISBN 978-3-525-55007-6

==== Hungarian ====
- Papp, Ferenc, A magyar nyelv szóvégmutató szótára [Reverse-alphabetized dictionary of the Hungarian language]. Akadémiai Kiadó, Budapest, 1969, 2nd ed.: 1994. ISBN 9630567326

==== Italian ====
- Alinei, M.L., Dizionario inverso italiano, con indici e liste di frequenza delle terminazioni, Mouton & Co., The Hague 1965.

==== Latin ====
- Gradenwitz, Otto, Laterculi vocum latinarum], Leipzig : S. Hirzel, 1904.
- ΛΟΓΕΙΟΝ: Dictionaries for ancient Greek and Latin, University of Chicago. (in every page / for every lemma, there is an index which can be either forward or reverse)

==== Macedonian ====
- Mitrevski, George, Macedonian Reverse Dictionary = Македонски обратен речник.

==== Manchu ====
- Rozycki, William, A reverse index of Manchu, Research Institute for Inner Asian Studies, Indiana University, Bloomington, 1981.

==== Mongolian ====
- Krueger, John Richard, Mongolian epigraphical dictionary in reverse listing, Indiana University, Bloomington, 1967.
- Vietze, Hans Peter, Rückläufiges Wörterbuch der mongolischen Sprache, Verlag Enzyklopädie, Leipzig, 1976.

==== Russian ====
- Reverse Russian Wiktionary
- Bielfeldt, H.H., Rückläufiges Wörterbuch der Russischen Sprache der Gegenwart, Akademie Verlag, Berlin, 1958.
- Шевелева, М.С. et al. (ed.), Обратный словарь русского языка, Советская Энциклопедия, Москва, 1974.

==== Sanskrit ====
- Schwarz, Wolfgang, Rückläufiges Wörterbuch des Altindischen = Reverse Dictionary of Old Indian, Harrassowitz, Wiesbaden, 1974–1978.

==== Serbo-Croatian ====
- Matešić, Josip, Rückläufiges Wörterbuch des Serbokroatischen, Otto Harrassowitz, Wiesbaden, 1965–1967.
- Николић, Мирослав, Обратни речник српскога језика, Матица српска / САНУ / Палчић, Нови Сад / Београд, 2000.

==== Slovak ====
- Garabík, Radovan et al., Retrográdny slovník súčasnej slovenčiny – slovné tvary na báze Slovenského národného korpusu, VEDA, vydavateľstvo SAV, Bratislava, 2018. ISBN 978-80-224-1699-3.
- Mistrík, Jozef, Retrográdny slovník slovenčiny, Univerzita Komenského, Bratislava, 1976. 735 pp.

==== Slovene ====
- Hajnšek-Holz, Milena and Primož Jakopin, Odzadnji slovar slovenskega jezika po Slovarju slovenskega knjižnega jezika, ZRC SAZU, Ljubljana, 1996.

==== Spanish ====
- Bosque, I., Pérez, M., Diccionario inverso de la lengua española, Gredos, Madrid, 1987.
- Stahl, Fred A., Scavnicky, Gary E. A., A Reverse Dictionary of the Spanish Language, University of Illinois Press, Urbana, IL, 1974.

==== Turkish ====
- Kubiyak, Yel, Rückläufiges Wörterbuch des Türkischen, Landeck, Frankfurt, 2004.

==== Welsh ====
- Zimmer, Stefan, A reverse dictionary of modern Welsh = Geiriadur gwrthdroadol Cymraeg diweddar, Buske, Hamburg, 1987.

== See also ==
- Reverse index
