= Revoscalepy =

revoscalepy
- Original author: Microsoft
- Initial release: 2017; 9 years ago
- Written in: Python
- Platform: Windows, Linux
- Available in: Python
- Website: docs.microsoft.com/en-us/machine-learning-server/python-reference/revoscalepy/revoscalepy-package/

revoscalepy is a machine learning package in Python created by Microsoft. It is available as part of Machine Learning Services in Microsoft SQL Server 2017 and Machine Learning Server 9.2.0 and later.

The package contains functions for creating linear model, logistic regression, random forest, decision tree and boosted decision tree, in addition to some summary functions for inspecting data. Other machine learning algorithms such as neural network are provided in microsoftml, a separate package that is the Python version of MicrosoftML.

revoscalepy also contains functions designed to run machine learning algorithms in different compute contexts, including SQL Server, Apache Spark, and Hadoop.

In June 2021, Microsoft announced to open source the revoscalepy and RevoScaleR packages, making them freely available under the MIT License.

== See also ==
- Microsoft Machine Learning Services
