= Basis database =

Presumptive removal of LLM-generated content, see WP:AINB#User:Sparks19923. Feel free to reinstate by following the procedures for disputing presumptive removal of LLM-generated content.Basis database or OpenText Collections Server is an Extended Relational Database Management System (RDBMS) produced by OpenText.

BASIS was originally developed by the Battelle Institute, and was spun off into Information Dimensions, a private company based out of Columbus Ohio. The strength of BASIS was its Full Text Indexing.

The original version of BASIS was eventually merged with an RDBMS system called DM, and the resulting product was called BASISplus.

Although the product is an extremely powerful and robust Full Text Database that incorporates a number of interesting features such as an integrated Thesaurus, early SGML support and BLOB storage, it remains a very niche product which struggles to keep its market share.

The product runs on multiple platforms, and has a number of programming interfaces, including ODBC and JDBC drivers.
