= SQL CLR =

Microsoft database software technology

SQL CLR or SQLCLR (SQL Common Language Runtime) is technology for hosting of the Microsoft .NET common language runtime engine within SQL Server. The SQLCLR allows managed code to be hosted by, and run in, the Microsoft SQL Server environment.

This technology, introduced in Microsoft SQL Server 2005, allow users for example to create the following types of managed code objects in SQL Server in .NET languages such as C# or VB.NET.

- Stored procedures (SPs) which are analogous to procedures or void functions in procedural languages like VB or C,
- Triggers which are stored procedures that fire in response to Data Manipulation Language (DML) or Data Definition Language (DDL) events,
- User-defined functions (UDFs) which are analogous to functions in procedural languages,
- User-defined aggregates (UDAs) which allow developers to create custom aggregates that act on sets of data instead of one row at a time,
- User-defined types (UDTs) that allow users to create simple or complex data types which can be serialized and deserialized within the database.

The SQL CLR relies on the creation, deployment, and registration of CLI assemblies, which are physically stored in managed code dynamic load libraries (DLLs). These assemblies may contain CLI namespaces, classes, functions and properties.
