= MnoGoSearch =

Search engine

mnoGoSearch was an open-source web search engine for Microsoft Windows and Linux that was in operation between 2001 and 2022.
