= Stumpers-L =

Electronic mailing list

The Stumpers-L electronic mailing list was a resource available for librarians and others to discuss reference questions which they were unable to answer using available resources. It was succeeded by the similar Project Wombat.

== Origins ==
Stumpers-L began in 1992, created by Ann Feeney, a library school graduate student at Rosary College in River Forest, Illinois, United States. It was moved to Concordia University, Chicago, then back to Rosary, which was then renamed Dominican University. From 2002 to 2005 it was maintained by the Dominican University Graduate School of Library and Information Science program. At the end of 2005 Dominican University ceased hosting the list. A replacement list, known as Project Wombat, commenced in January 2006, and is hosted by Project Gutenberg.

Originally the Stumpers-L archive was a gopher resource, but it migrated to the World Wide Web once the web became more universally used in the mid-1990s.

== Topics ==
Typical Stumpers-L topics include:

- "Which words in the English language end in -gry?"
- "Who wrote The Book of Counted Sorrows, and where can I get a copy?"
- "Is there a novel with no letter 'e' in it?"
- "Where can I find information on Kombucha/Manchurian Mushroom Tea?"
- "If the average human body were broken down into its constituent chemicals, how much would they be worth?"

== Public notice ==
A book of Stumpers-L questions and answers was published in 1998 by Random House, edited by Fred Shapiro of Yale and titled Stumpers! Answers to Hundreds of Questions That Stumped The Experts (ISBN 0-375-70174-5). Shapiro was an active member; other prominent members include Barbara and David P. Mikkelson, the co-editors of Snopes.com.

The unofficial mascot of the Stumpers-L list is the wombat.
