= Phrase search =

In computer science, phrase searching allows users to retrieve content from information systems (such as documents from file storage systems, records from databases, and web pages on the internet) that contains a specific order and combination of words defined by the user.

Phrase search is one of many search operators that are standard in search engine technology, along with Boolean operators (AND, OR, and NOT), truncation and wildcard operators (commonly represented by the asterisk symbol), field code operators (which look for specific words in defined fields, such as the Author field in a periodical database), and proximity operators (which look for defined words that appear close to one another, if not directly next to each other as in a phrase search). Search operators are used to refine a search when a simple keyword search provides too many unwanted results.

Although the exact functionality of each search engine is determined by its developers, phrase searching is normally accomplished by wrapping the desired phrase in quotation marks. For example, a search for red apple may return records that contain the word "apple," ones that contain "red," and ones that contain both words no matter where in the record they appear (that is, assuming the search engine applies Boolean OR logic to its keyword search function), whereas a search for "red apple" will only return records that contain the phrase "red apple."

Phrase search is one of the more important techniques associated with optimizing the textual content of web pages in such a way that it is likely to be found by someone searching for a certain string of text.
