= Subspace Gaussian mixture model =

Acoustic modeling approach in which all phonetic states share a common Gaussian

Subspace Gaussian mixture model (SGMM) is an acoustic modeling approach in which all phonetic states share a common Gaussian mixture model structure, and the means and mixture weights vary in a subspace of the total parameter space.
