= Yee Whye Teh =

Artificial-intelligence researcher

Yee-Whye Teh
- Education: University of Toronto (PhD); University of Waterloo (BMath); Dunman High School
- Known for: Hierarchical Dirichlet process Deep belief networks
- Scientific career
- Fields: Machine learning Artificial intelligence Statistics; Computer science
- Workplaces: University of Oxford; DeepMind; University College London; University of California, Berkeley; National University of Singapore
- Thesis: Bethe free energy and contrastive divergence approximations for undirected graphical models (2003)
- Doctoral advisor: Geoffrey Hinton
- Website: www.stats.ox.ac.uk/~teh/

Yee-Whye Teh is a professor of statistical machine learning in the Department of Statistics, University of Oxford. Prior to 2012 he was a reader at the Gatsby Charitable Foundation computational neuroscience unit at University College London. His work is primarily in machine learning, artificial intelligence, statistics and computer science.

== Early life and education ==
Teh was born in Bukit Mertajam, Malaysia in 1977. He received his secondary education at Dunman High School, graduating in 1994.

Teh then received his tertiary education at the University of Waterloo and the University of Toronto where he was awarded a PhD in 2003 for research supervised by Geoffrey Hinton.

== Research and career ==
Teh was a postdoctoral fellow at the University of California, Berkeley and the National University of Singapore before he joined University College London as a lecturer.

Teh was one of the original developers of deep belief networks and of hierarchical Dirichlet processes.

He has been a research scientist at Google DeepMind.

=== Awards and honours ===
Teh was a keynote speaker at Uncertainty in Artificial Intelligence (UAI) 2019, and was invited to give the Breiman lecture at the Conference on Neural Information Processing Systems (NeurIPS) 2017. He served as program co-chair of the International Conference on Machine Learning (ICML) in 2017, one of the premier conferences in machine learning.
