= Matthew Stephens (statistician) =

British statistician and geneticist

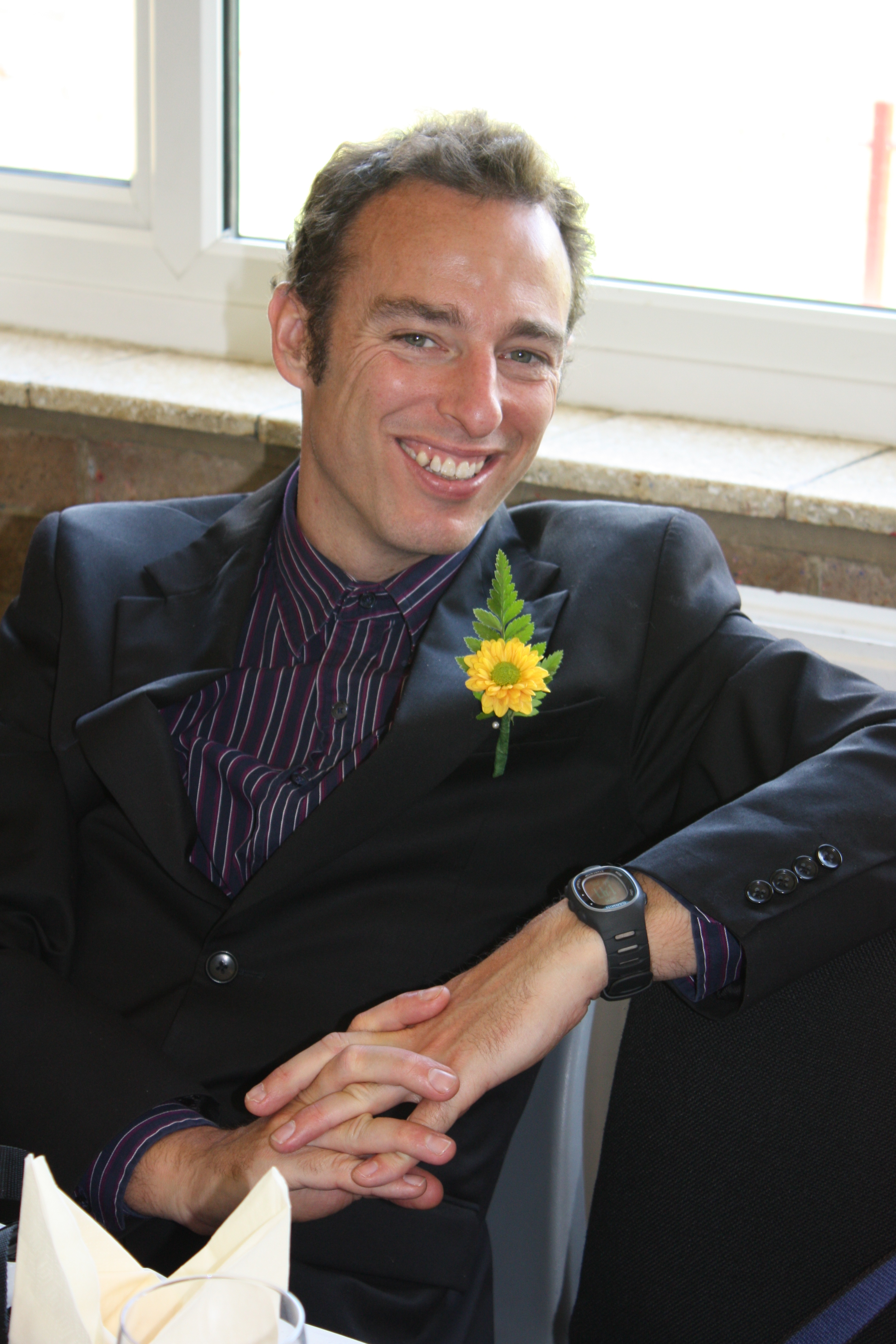
Stephens in 2016

Matthew Stephens FRS (born 1970) is a Bayesian statistician and professor in the departments of human genetics and statistics at the University of Chicago. He is known for the Li and Stephens model as an efficient coalescent.

== Education ==
Stephens has a PhD from Magdalen College, Oxford University where his advisor was Brian D. Ripley. He then went on to work with Peter Donnelly as a postdoctoral researcher.

== Career ==
Stephens conducted postdoctoral research with Peter Donnelly at the University of Oxford. It was there that he developed the Structure computer program, along with Jonathan Pritchard, which is used for determining population structure and estimating individual admixture. He then went on to develop the influential Li and Stephens model as an efficient model for linkage disequilibrium.

== Awards ==
Stephens was awarded the Guy Medal (bronze) in 2006. He was elected a Fellow of the Royal Society in 2023.
