= R v Adams =

Ruling which criticised the use of Bayesian statistics in determining guilt

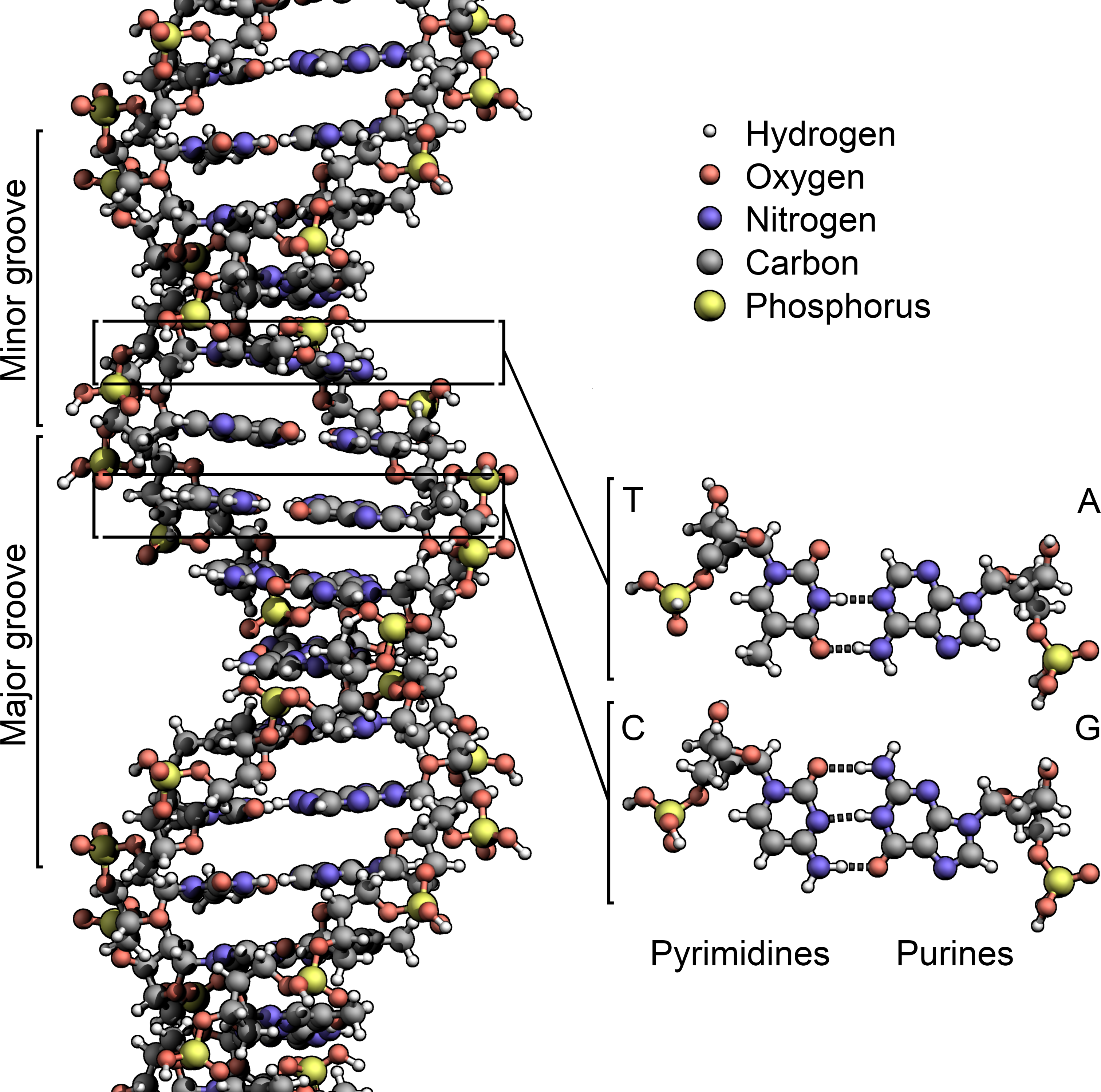
- The panel judgement, and its aftermath laid out the proper directions for the probability of a DNA match, where a good DNA sample was obtained from the crime scene and "matched" to the defendant
- Court: Court of Appeal of England and Wales
- Full case name: Regina v. Denis John Adams
- Decided: April 26, 1996
- Citations: [1996] EWCA Crim 10 [1996] EWCA Crim 222; 2 Cr App R 467 [1996] Crim LR 898, CA [1998] 1 Cr App R 377; The Times, 3 November 1997

Case history
- Prior action: Trial with conviction by jury
- Appealed from: Central Criminal Court
- Subsequent action: Retrial by a properly-directed jury as to DNA evidence

Court membership
- Judges sitting: Rose LJ, Hidden J, Buxton J

Case opinions
- Decision by: Rose LJ

Keywords
- DNA evidence

R v Adams [1996] EWCA Crim 10 and 222, are rulings in the United Kingdom that banned the expression in court of headline (soundbite), standalone Bayesian statistics from the reasoning admissible before a jury in DNA evidence cases, in favour of the calculated average (and maximal) number of matching incidences among the nation's population. The facts involved strong but inconclusive evidence conflicting with the DNA evidence, leading to a retrial.

== Facts ==
A rape victim described her attacker as in his twenties. A suspect, Denis Adams, was arrested and an identity parade was arranged. The woman failed to pick him out, and on being asked if he fitted her description replied in the negative. She had described a man in his twenties and when asked how old Adams looked, she replied about forty. Adams was 37; he had an alibi for the night in question, his girlfriend saying he had spent the night with her. The DNA was the only incriminating evidence heard by the jury, as all the other evidence pointed towards innocence.

== Judgment ==
=== Use of Bayesian analysis in the court ===
The DNA profile of the suspect fit that of evidence left at the scene. The defence argued that the match probability figure put forward by the prosecution (1 in 200 million) was incorrect, and that a figure of 1 in 20 million, or perhaps even 1 in 2 million, was more appropriate. The issue of how the jury should resolve the conflicting evidence was addressed by the defence by a formal statistical method. The jury was instructed in the use of Bayes's theorem by Professor Peter Donnelly of Oxford University. The judge told the jury they could use Bayes's theorem if they wished. Adams was convicted and the case went to appeal. The Appeal Court judges noted that the original trial judge did not direct the jury as to what to do if they did not wish to use Bayes's theorem and ordered a retrial.

At the retrial the defence team again wanted to instruct the new jury in the use of Bayes's theorem (though Prof. Donnelly had doubts about the practicality of the approach). The judge asked that the statistical experts from both sides work together to produce a workable method of implementing Bayes's theorem for use in a courtroom, should the jury wish to use it. A questionnaire was produced which asked a series of questions such as:

- "If he were the attacker, what's the chance that she would say he looked nothing like the attacker?"
- "If he wasn't the attacker what's the chance that she would say he looked nothing like the attacker?"

These questions were intended to allow the Bayes factors of the various pieces of evidence to be assessed. The questionnaires had boxes where jurors could put their assessments and a formula to enable them to produce the overall odds of guilt or innocence. Adams was convicted once again and again an appeal was made to the Court of Appeal. The appeal was unsuccessful but the Appeal Court ruling was highly critical of the appropriateness of Bayes's theorem in the courtroom.

=== Statistical analysis of DNA ===
The only evidence against Adams was the DNA evidence. His age was substantially different from that reported by the victim, the victim did not identify him and he had an alibi which was never disproved. The 1 in 200 million match probability calculation did not allow for the fact that the perpetrator might be a close relative of the defendant – an important point, since the defendant had a half-brother in his 20s whose DNA was never tested.

=== Court guidelines for using statistical evidence in DNA cases ===
The Court of Appeal after the appeal wrote the guidelines for the way that match probabilities should be explained to jurors. Judges should say something along the lines of the following.

"Suppose the match probability is 1 in 20 million. That means that in Britain (population about 60 million) there will be on average about 2 or 3 people, and certainly no more than 6 or 7, whose DNA matches that found at the crime scene, in addition to the accused. Now your job, as a member of the jury, is to decide on the basis of the other evidence, whether or not you are satisfied that it is the person on trial who is guilty, rather than one of the few other people with matching DNA. We don't know anything about the other matching people. They are likely to be distributed all across the country and may have been nowhere near the crime scene at the time of the crime. Others may be ruled out as being the wrong sex or the wrong age group."

== See also ==
- English law
- Base rate fallacy
- R v Doheny and Adams [1997] 1 Crim App R 369
