= Peter Donnelly =

Statistical geneticist

Sir Peter James Donnelly FRS FMedSci (born 15 May 1959) is an Australian-British mathematician and Professor of Statistical Science at the University of Oxford, and the CEO of Genomics PLC. He is a specialist in applied probability and has made contributions to coalescent theory. His research group at Oxford has an international reputation for the development of statistical methodology to analyze genetic data.

== Background, family and education ==
Peter James Donnelly was born and raised in Brisbane, Queensland, the son of financial adviser, economic theorist and author Austin Donnelly and Sheila Donnelly. He is the brother of Sharon Donnelly and of eminent Australian financier, funds manager and company director Melda Donnelly. He was educated at St. Joseph's Christian Brothers College, Gregory Terrace, and later at the University of Queensland and at Balliol College, Oxford.

== Professional life ==
When elected to a chair at Queen Mary College, London in 1988 Donnelly was only 29. He held a chair at the University of Chicago (1994–96) and was head of the Department of Statistics at the University of Oxford from 1996 to 2001. From 2007 to 2018, he was Director, Wellcome Trust Centre for Human Genetics (WTCHG) in Oxford. He is a fellow at St Anne's College, Oxford.

Many leading statistical geneticists worked with Donnelly as young researchers including David Balding, Matthew Stephens and Jonathan Pritchard. One area in which he has a leading reputation is in the interpretation of DNA evidence. He has acted as an expert witness on forensic science in criminal trials.

He is noted for his collaborative work with biologists. He has been heavily involved in a number of large scale projects, such as the International HapMap Project and the Wellcome Trust Case Control Consortium, a genome-wide association study.

In 2015, Donnelly was elected as Chairman of the Royal Society's Machine Learning Working Group.

== Awards and honours ==
Donnelly was elected a Fellow of the Royal Society in 2006 and also elected as a Fellow of the Academy of Medical Sciences in 2008.

Other significant awards and honours have included:

- 1980 University Medal, University of Queensland
- 1980-1983 Rhodes Scholarship
- 1984-1985 University of Wales Research Fellowship
- 1988 Elected Ordinary Member of the International Statistical Institute
- 1990 Special Invited Lecturer, Institute of Mathematical Statistics
- 1990-1995 SERC Advanced Fellowship
- 1995 Elected Fellow of the Institute of Mathematical Statistics
- 1999 Elected Honorary Fellow, Institute of Actuaries
- 2000 Bernoulli Lecturer, 5th World Congress of the Bernoulli Society
- 2001 Forum Lecturer, European Meeting of Statisticians
- 2002 Editor's Invited Paper, Statistical Society of Australia
- 2002 Mitchell Prize, of the American Statistical Association and ISBA
- 2004 Guy Medal in Silver, Royal Statistical Society
- 2007 Medallion Lecturer, Institute of Mathematical Statistics.
- 2007 The main paper from the Wellcome Trust Case Control Consortium, which Donnelly chaired, won several awards, including The Lancet's Paper of the Year, Scientific American's Research Leader of the Year, the Amadeus Prize, and one of Nature's Editor's Picks for 2007.
- 2009 Awarded the Weldon Memorial Prize
- 2020 The Genetics Society Medal
- 2021 Royal Society Gabor Medal
- 2022 Awarded an honorary doctoral degree from the University of Melbourne
- 2022 American Society for Human Genetics Lifetime Achievement Award

Donnelly was knighted in the 2019 Birthday Honours for services to the understanding of human genetics in disease.

== See also ==
- R v Adams
