= Probabilistic latent semantic analysis =

Method for analyzing semantic data

Probabilistic latent semantic analysis (PLSA), also known as probabilistic latent semantic indexing (PLSI, especially in information retrieval circles) is a statistical technique for the analysis of two-mode and co-occurrence data. In effect, one can derive a low-dimensional representation of the observed variables in terms of their affinity to certain hidden variables, just as in latent semantic analysis, from which PLSA evolved.

Compared to standard latent semantic analysis which stems from linear algebra and downsizes the occurrence tables (usually via a singular value decomposition), probabilistic latent semantic analysis is based on a mixture decomposition derived from a latent class model.

== Model ==
Plate notation representing the PLSA model ("asymmetric" formulation). $d$ is the document index variable, $c$ is a word's topic drawn from the document's topic distribution, $P(c|d)$, and $w$ is a word drawn from the word distribution of this word's topic, $P(w|c)$ . The $d$ and $w$ are observable variables, the topic $c$ is a latent variable.

Considering observations in the form of co-occurrences $(w,d)$ of words and documents, PLSA models the probability of each co-occurrence as a mixture of conditionally independent multinomial distributions:

$$P(w,d) = \sum_c P(d) P(c|d) P(w|c) = P(d) \sum_c P(c|d) P(w|c)$$

with $c$ being the words' topic. Note that the number of topics is a hyperparameter that must be chosen in advance and is not estimated from the data. The first formulation is the symmetric formulation, where $w$ and $d$ are both generated from the latent class $c$ in similar ways (using the conditional probabilities $P(d|c)$ and $P(w|c)$), whereas the second formulation is the asymmetric formulation, where, for each document $d$, a latent class is chosen conditionally to the document according to $P(c|d)$, and a word is then generated from that class according to $P(w|c)$. Although we have used words and documents in this example, the co-occurrence of any couple of discrete variables may be modelled in exactly the same way.

So, the number of parameters is equal to $cd + wc$. The number of parameters grows linearly with the number of documents. In addition, although PLSA is a generative model of the documents in the collection it is estimated on, it is not a generative model of new documents.

Their parameters are learned using the EM algorithm.

== Application ==
PLSA may be used in a discriminative setting, via Fisher kernels.

PLSA has applications in information retrieval and filtering, natural language processing, machine learning from text, bioinformatics, and related areas.

It is reported that the aspect model used in the probabilistic latent semantic analysis has severe overfitting problems.

== Extensions ==
- Hierarchical extensions:
  - Asymmetric: MASHA ("Multinomial ASymmetric Hierarchical Analysis")
  - Symmetric: HPLSA ("Hierarchical Probabilistic Latent Semantic Analysis")
- Generative models: The following models have been developed to address an often-criticized shortcoming of PLSA, namely that it is not a proper generative model for new documents.
  - Latent Dirichlet allocation – adds a Dirichlet prior on the per-document topic distribution
- Higher-order data: Although this is rarely discussed in the scientific literature, PLSA extends naturally to higher order data (three modes and higher), i.e. it can model co-occurrences over three or more variables. In the symmetric formulation above, this is done simply by adding conditional probability distributions for these additional variables. This is the probabilistic analogue to non-negative tensor factorisation.

== History ==
This is an example of a latent class model (see references therein), and it is related to non-negative matrix factorization. The present terminology was coined in 1999 by Thomas Hofmann.

== See also ==
- Compound term processing
- Pachinko allocation
- Vector space model
