= Jonathan K. Pritchard =

British geneticist

Jonathan Pritchard
- Education: Pennsylvania State University (BS); Stanford University (PhD)
- Awards: Edward Novitski Prize (2013)
- Scientific career
- Fields: Population genetics; Genomics
- Workplaces: Stanford University; University of Oxford; University of Chicago
- Thesis: Methods for inferring human evolutionary history using genetic markers (1998)
- Doctoral advisor: Marcus Feldman
- Other academic advisors: Peter Donnelly
- Website: pritchardlab.stanford.edu

Jonathan Karl Pritchard is an English-born professor of genetics at Stanford University, best known for his development of the STRUCTURE algorithm for studying population structure and his work on human genetic variation and evolution. His research interests lie in the study of human evolution, in particular in understanding the association between genetic variation among human individuals and human traits. He was elected a Member of the National Academy of Sciences in 2025.

== Education ==
Pritchard's family moved to the US when he was a teenager. He studied biology and mathematics at Pennsylvania State University, and then went on to graduate studies in biology at Stanford University under the supervision of Marc Feldman, finishing in 1998.

== Career ==
Pritchard conducted postdoctoral research with Peter Donnelly at the University of Oxford. It was there that he developed STRUCTURE, a widely used computer program for determining population structure and estimating individual admixture. In 2001, he moved to the University of Chicago. He was promoted from Assistant Professor to Full Professor in 2006. He stayed there until moving to Stanford in 2013. He was awarded a Howard Hughes Medical Institute (HHMI) investigator position in 2008.

== Awards and honours ==
Pritchard was a recipient of the 2013 Edward Novitski Prize from the Genetics Society of America and the 2002 Mitchell Prize from the International Society for Bayesian Analysis.

== Personal life ==
Pritchard ran track and cross country for Pennsylvania State University from 1989 to 1994. In part because of his running experience, he appeared in the 1998 movie Without Limits portraying David Bedford, an English distance runner who participated in the 1972 Munich Olympics. As a result of his appearance in Without Limits and his publication of ″Population Growth of Human Y Chromosomes: A study of Y Chromosome Microsatellites″ with Marcus Feldman, he has an Erdős–Bacon number of 6.
