= Local independence =

Within statistics, Local independence is the underlying assumption of latent variable models (such as factor analysis and item response theory models). The observed items are conditionally independent of each other given an individual score on the latent variable(s). This means that the latent variable(s) in a model fully explain why the observed items are related to one another. This can be explained by the following example.

== Example ==
Local independence can be explained by an example of Lazarsfeld and Henry (1968). Suppose that a sample of 1000 people was asked whether they read journals A and B. Their responses were as follows:

	Read A	Did not read A	Total
Read B	260	140	400
Did not read B	240	360	600
Total	500	500	1000

One can easily see that the two variables (reading A and reading B) are strongly related, and thus dependent on each other. Readers of A tend to read B more often (52%=260/500) than non-readers of A (28%=140/500). If reading A and B were independent, then the formula P(A&B) = P(A)×P(B) would hold. But 260/1000 isn't 400/1000 × 500/1000. Thus, reading A and B are statistically dependent on each other.

If the analysis is extended to also look at the education level of these people, the following tables are found.

High education	Read A	Did not read A	Total
Read B	240	60	300
Did not read B	160	40	200
Total	400	100	500

Low education	Read A	Did not read A	Total
Read B	20	80	100
Did not read B	80	320	400
Total	100	400	500

Again, if reading A and B were independent, then P(A&B) = P(A)×P(B) would hold separately for each education level. And, in fact, 240/500 = 300/500×400/500 and 20/500 = 100/500×100/500. Thus if a separation is made between people with high and low education backgrounds, there is no dependence between readership of the two journals. That is, reading A and B are independent once educational level is taken into consideration. The educational level 'explains' the difference in reading of A and B. If educational level is never actually observed or known, it may still appear as a latent variable in the model.

== See also ==
- Conditional independence
