= Graphical lasso =

Statistical estimator

In statistics, the graphical lasso is a penalized likelihood estimator for the precision matrix (also called the concentration matrix or inverse covariance matrix) of a multivariate elliptical distribution. Through the use of an $L_1$ penalty, it performs regularization to give a sparse estimate for the precision matrix. In the case of multivariate Gaussian distributions, sparsity in the precision matrix corresponds to conditional independence between the variables therefore implying a Gaussian graphical model.

The graphical lasso was originally formulated to solve Dempster's covariance selection problem for the multivariate Gaussian distribution when observations were limited. Subsequently, the optimization algorithms to solve this problem were improved and extended to other types of estimators and distributions.

== Setting ==
Let $S$ be the sample covariance matrix of an independent identically distributed sample from a multivariate Gaussian distribution $X \sim N(\mu, \Sigma)$. We are interested in estimating the precision matrix $\Sigma^{-1} = \Theta = (\Theta_{ij})$.

The graphical lasso estimator $\hat{\Theta}$ is the maximiser of the $L_1$ penalised log-likelihood:

$$\hat{\Theta} = \operatorname{argmax}_{\Theta \succ 0} \left(\log \det(\Theta) - \operatorname{tr}(S \Theta) - \lambda \sum_{i,j} |\Theta_{ij}| \right)$$

where $\lambda$ is a penalty parameter, $\operatorname{tr}$ is the trace function and $\Theta \succ 0$ refers to the set of positive definite matrices.

A popular alternative form of the graphical lasso removes the penalty on the diagonal, only penalising the off-diagonal entries:

$$\hat{\Theta} = \operatorname{argmax}_{\Theta \succ 0} \left(\log \det(\Theta) - \operatorname{tr}(S \Theta) - \lambda \sum_{i \neq j} |\Theta_{ij}| \right)$$

Because the graphical lasso estimate is not invariant to scalar multiplication of the variables, it is important to normalize the data before applying the graphical lasso.

== Application ==
To obtain the estimator in programs, users could use the R package glasso, GraphicalLasso() class in the scikit-learn Python library, or the skggm Python package (similar to scikit-learn).

== See also ==
- Graphical model
- Lasso (statistics)
