= Generalized iterative scaling =

In statistics, generalized iterative scaling (GIS) and improved iterative scaling (IIS) are two early algorithms used to fit log-linear models, notably multinomial logistic regression (MaxEnt) classifiers and extensions of it such as MaxEnt Markov models and conditional random fields. These algorithms have been largely surpassed by gradient-based methods such as L-BFGS and coordinate descent algorithms.

== See also ==
- Expectation-maximization
