= Constrained conditional model =

Machine learning and inference framework

A constrained conditional model (CCM) is a machine learning and inference framework that augments the learning of conditional (probabilistic or discriminative) models with declarative constraints. The constraint can be used as a way to incorporate expressive prior knowledge into the model and bias the assignments made by the learned model to satisfy these constraints. The framework can be used to support decisions in an expressive output space while maintaining modularity and tractability of training and inference.

Models of this kind have recently attracted much attention within the natural language processing (NLP) community. Formulating problems as constrained optimization problems over the output of learned models has several advantages. It allows one to focus on the modeling of problems by providing the opportunity to incorporate domain-specific knowledge as global constraints using a first order language. Using this declarative framework frees the developer from low level feature engineering while capturing the problem's domain-specific properties and guarantying exact inference. From a machine learning perspective it allows decoupling the stage of model generation (learning) from that of the constrained inference stage, thus helping to simplify the learning stage while improving the quality of the solutions. For example, in the case of generating compressed sentences, rather than simply relying on a language model to retain the most commonly used n-grams in the sentence, constraints can be used to ensure that if a modifier is kept in the compressed sentence, its subject will also be kept.

== Motivation ==
Making decisions in many domains (such as natural language processing and computer vision problems) often involves assigning values to sets of interdependent variables where the expressive dependency structure can influence, or even dictate, what assignments are possible. These settings are applicable not only to Structured Learning problems such as semantic role labeling, but also for cases that require making use of multiple pre-learned components, such as summarization, textual entailment and question answering. In all these cases, it is natural to formulate the decision problem as a constrained optimization problem, with an objective function that is composed of learned models, subject to domain- or problem-specific constraints.

Constrained conditional models form a learning and inference framework that augments the learning of conditional (probabilistic or discriminative) models with declarative constraints (written, for example, using a first-order representation) as a way to support decisions in an expressive output space while maintaining modularity and tractability of training and inference. These constraints can express either hard restrictions, completely prohibiting some assignments, or soft restrictions, penalizing unlikely assignments. In most applications of this framework in NLP, following, Integer Linear Programming (ILP) was used as the inference framework, although other algorithms can be used for that purpose.

== Formal Definition ==
Given a set of feature functions $\{ \phi_i(x,y) \}$ and a set of constraints $\{ C_i (x,y)\}$, defined over an input structure $x \in X$ and an output structure $y \in Y$, a constraint conditional model is characterized by two weight vectors, w and $\rho$, and is defined as the solution to the following optimization problem:

$$argmax_{y} \sum_i w_i \phi_i (x,y) - \sum \rho_i C_i (x,y)$$.

Each constraint $C_i \in C$ is a boolean mapping indicating if the joint assignment $(x,y)$ violates a constraint, and $\rho$ is the penalty incurred for violating the constraints. Constraints assigned an infinite penalty are known as hard constraints, and represent unfeasible assignments to the optimization problem.

== Training paradigms ==
=== Learning local vs. global models ===
The objective function used by CCMs can be decomposed and learned in several ways, ranging from a complete joint training of the model along with the constraints to completely decoupling the learning and the inference stage. In the latter case, several local models are learned independently and the dependency between these models is considered only at decision time via a global decision process. The advantages of each approach are discussed in which studies the two training paradigms: (1) local models: L+I (learning + inference) and (2) global model: IBT (Inference based training), and shows both theoretically and experimentally that while IBT (joint training) is best in the limit, under some conditions (basically, ”good” components) L+I can generalize better.

The ability of CCM to combine local models is especially beneficial in cases where joint learning is computationally intractable or when training data are not available for joint learning. This flexibility distinguishes CCM from the other learning frameworks that also combine statistical information with declarative constraints, such as Markov logic network, that emphasize joint training.

=== Minimally supervised CCM ===
CCM can help reduce supervision by using domain knowledge (expressed as constraints) to drive learning. These settings were studied in and. These works introduce semi-supervised Constraints Driven Learning (CODL) and show that by incorporating domain knowledge the performance of the learned model improves significantly.

=== Learning over latent representations ===
CCMs have also been applied to latent learning frameworks, where the learning problem is defined over a latent representation layer. Since the notion of a correct representation is inherently ill-defined, no gold-standard labeled data regarding the representation decision is available to the learner. Identifying the correct (or optimal) learning representation is viewed as a structured prediction process and therefore modeled as a CCM. This problem was covered in several papers, in both supervised and unsupervised settings. In all cases research showed that explicitly modeling the interdependencies between representation decisions via constraints results in an improved performance.

== Integer linear programming for natural language processing applications ==
The advantages of the CCM declarative formulation and the availability of off-the-shelf solvers have led to a large variety of natural language processing tasks being formulated within the framework, including semantic role labeling, syntactic parsing, coreference resolution, summarization, transliteration, natural language generation and joint information extraction.

Most of these works use an integer linear programming (ILP) solver to solve the decision problem. Although theoretically solving an Integer Linear Program is exponential in the size of the decision problem, in practice using state-of-the-art solvers and approximate inference techniques large scale problems can be solved efficiently.

The key advantage of using an ILP solver for solving the optimization problem defined by a constrained conditional model is the declarative formulation used as input for the ILP solver, consisting of a linear objective function and a set of linear constraints.

== Resources ==
- CCM Tutorial Predicting Structures in NLP: Constrained Conditional Models and Integer Linear Programming in NLP
