= Normal-Wishart distribution =

Multivariate probability distribution

Normal-Wishart
- Notation: $(\boldsymbol\mu,\boldsymbol\Lambda) \sim \mathrm{NW}(\boldsymbol\mu_0,\lambda,\mathbf{W},\nu)$
- Parameters: $\boldsymbol\mu_0\in\mathbb{R}^D\,$ location (vector of real) $\lambda > 0\,$ (real) $\mathbf{W} \in\mathbb{R}^{D\times D}$ scale matrix (pos. def.) $\nu > D-1\,$ (real)
- Support: $\boldsymbol\mu\in\mathbb{R}^D ; \boldsymbol\Lambda \in\mathbb{R}^{D\times D}$ covariance matrix (pos. def.)
- PDF: $f(\boldsymbol\mu,\boldsymbol\Lambda|\boldsymbol\mu_0,\lambda,\mathbf{W},\nu) = \mathcal{N}(\boldsymbol\mu|\boldsymbol\mu_0,(\lambda\boldsymbol\Lambda)^{-1})\ \mathcal{W}(\boldsymbol\Lambda|\mathbf{W},\nu)$

In probability theory and statistics, the normal-Wishart distribution (or Gaussian-Wishart distribution) is a multivariate four-parameter family of continuous probability distributions. It is the conjugate prior of a multivariate normal distribution with unknown mean and precision matrix (the inverse of the covariance matrix).

== Definition ==
Suppose

$$\boldsymbol\mu|\boldsymbol\mu_0,\lambda,\boldsymbol\Lambda \sim \mathcal{N}(\boldsymbol\mu_0,(\lambda\boldsymbol\Lambda)^{-1})$$

has a multivariate normal distribution with mean $\boldsymbol\mu_0$ and covariance matrix $(\lambda\boldsymbol\Lambda)^{-1}$, where

$$\boldsymbol\Lambda|\mathbf{W},\nu \sim \mathcal{W}(\boldsymbol\Lambda|\mathbf{W},\nu)$$

has a Wishart distribution. Then $(\boldsymbol\mu,\boldsymbol\Lambda)$ has a normal-Wishart distribution, denoted as

$$(\boldsymbol\mu,\boldsymbol\Lambda) \sim \mathrm{NW}(\boldsymbol\mu_0,\lambda,\mathbf{W},\nu) .$$

== Characterization ==
=== Probability density function ===
$$f(\boldsymbol\mu,\boldsymbol\Lambda|\boldsymbol\mu_0,\lambda,\mathbf{W},\nu) = \mathcal{N}(\boldsymbol\mu|\boldsymbol\mu_0,(\lambda\boldsymbol\Lambda)^{-1})\ \mathcal{W}(\boldsymbol\Lambda|\mathbf{W},\nu)$$

== Properties ==
=== Marginal distributions ===
By construction, the marginal distribution over $\boldsymbol\Lambda$ is a Wishart distribution, and the conditional distribution over $\boldsymbol\mu$ given $\boldsymbol\Lambda$ is a multivariate normal distribution. The marginal distribution over $\boldsymbol\mu$ is a multivariate t-distribution.

== Posterior distribution of the parameters ==
After making $n$ observations $\boldsymbol{x}_1, \dots, \boldsymbol{x}_n$, the posterior distribution of the parameters is

$$(\boldsymbol\mu,\boldsymbol\Lambda) \sim \mathrm{NW}(\boldsymbol\mu_n,\lambda_n,\mathbf{W}_n,\nu_n),$$

where

$$\lambda_n = \lambda + n,$$
$$\boldsymbol\mu_n = \frac{\lambda \boldsymbol\mu_0 + n\boldsymbol{\bar{x}}}{\lambda + n},$$
$$\nu_n = \nu + n,$$
$\mathbf{W}_n^{-1} = \mathbf{W}^{-1} + \sum_{i=1}^n (\boldsymbol{x}_i - \boldsymbol{\bar{x}})(\boldsymbol{x}_i - \boldsymbol{\bar{x}})^T + \frac{n \lambda}{n + \lambda} (\boldsymbol{\bar{x}} - \boldsymbol\mu_0)(\boldsymbol{\bar{x}} - \boldsymbol\mu_0)^T.$

== Generating normal-Wishart random variates ==
Generation of random variates is straightforward:

1. Sample $\boldsymbol\Lambda$ from a Wishart distribution with parameters $\mathbf{W}$ and $\nu$
2. Sample $\boldsymbol\mu$ from a multivariate normal distribution with mean $\boldsymbol\mu_0$ and variance $(\lambda\boldsymbol\Lambda)^{-1}$

== Related distributions ==
- The normal-inverse Wishart distribution is essentially the same distribution parameterized by variance rather than precision.
- The normal-gamma distribution is the one-dimensional equivalent.
- The multivariate normal distribution and Wishart distribution are the component distributions out of which this distribution is made.
