= Approximate inference =

Approximate inference methods make it possible to learn realistic models from big data by trading off computation time for accuracy, when exact learning and inference are computationally intractable.

== Major methods classes ==
- Laplace's approximation
- Variational Bayesian methods
- Markov chain Monte Carlo
- Expectation propagation
- Markov random fields
- Bayesian networks
  - Variational message passing
- Loopy and generalized belief propagation

== See also ==
- Statistical inference
- Fuzzy logic
- Data mining
