= Étienne Halphen =

French mathematician

- Born: 27 May 1911; Bordeaux, France
- Died: 11 August 1954 (aged 43); Neuilly-sur-Marne, France
- Resting place: Cemetery Montparnasse, Paris, France; 48.838°N 2.327°E
- Citizenship: French
- Education: École Normale Supérieure
- Scientific career
- Fields: Mathematics
- Workplaces: Societe hydro-technique de France; Électricité de France

Étienne Halphen (27 May 1911, in Bordeaux – 11 August 1954, in Neuilly-sur-Marne) was a French mathematician. He was known for his work in geometry, on probability distributions and information theory.

== Biography ==
He was born as son of Germaine (née Weill) and Louis Halphen, a professor of history at Sorbonne, and grandson of Georges Henri Halphen and Mathieu Weill, both renowned mathematicians. He did his studies at École Normale Supérieure, where he received his agrégation in 1933. He worked as a teacher at Lycée de Sens (Yonne), where he was granted an indefinite leave of absence after a year due to health issues. From 1936 to 1940 he was member of the Research Group on Calculus of Probabilities and Mathematical Statistics. During the German occupation of France, he was banned from public service, but reinstated in 1945. During that period he was invited by Pierre Massé to join a statistics research group on hydrology at Societe hydro-technique de France (SHF). With the creation of Électricité de France in 1946, Étienne Halphen and his group including Lucien Le Cam and Georges Morlat were attached to the Service des Études et Recherches Hydrauliques. [Service for studies and research in hydraulics]. He work there until 1951, when his health problems required hospitalisation. Suffering from periods of depression, he took his life in August 1954.

== Works ==
- 1929 Theorem on quadrics
- 1938 Most independent random variable
- 1939a Convergence of estimates
- 1939b On covariation
- 1941a Harmonic distribution and Type A law
- 1941b Statistical analysis of water flow of the Rhine
- 1945 Planning of electric energy production
- 1946a Planning of electric energy production
- 1946b On the industrial value of a waterfall
- 1949 Estimation in probability and its application
- 1952 Class of hypergeometric functions
- 1953a Planning of electric energy production
- 1953b Statistical analysis of the association of eye color with personality development

Posthumously:

- 1954 Characteristic intrinsic function, covering results obtained in 1938 and 1939
- 1955a Functions related to parabolic cylinder functions
- 1955b Subjective probability
- 1957 Properties of a discrete probability space invariant under permutation of its points

An overview of Halphen's work on probability distributions is given by Georges Morlat.

== Awards ==
Étienne Halphen received the Prix Montyon de Statistique of the Académie des sciences posthumously in November 1954 for his work on statistical hydrology.

== See also ==
- Harmonic distribution
- Generalized inverse Gaussian distribution
