= Generalised hyperbolic distribution =

Continuous probability distribution

Generalised hyperbolic
- Parameters: $\lambda$ (real) $\alpha$ (real) $\beta$ asymmetry parameter (real) $\delta$ scale parameter (real) $\mu$ location (real) $\gamma = \sqrt{\alpha^2 - \beta^2}$
- Support: $x \in (-\infty, +\infty)$
- PDF: $\frac{(\gamma/\delta)^\lambda}{\sqrt{2\pi}K_\lambda(\delta \gamma)} \; e^{\beta (x - \mu)} \!$ ${} \times \frac{K_{\lambda - 1/2}\left(\alpha \sqrt{\delta^2 + (x - \mu)^2}\right)}{\left(\sqrt{\delta^2 + (x - \mu)^2} / \alpha\right)^{1/2 - \lambda}} \!$
- Mean: $\mu + \frac{\delta \beta K_{\lambda+1}(\delta \gamma)}{\gamma K_\lambda(\delta\gamma)}$
- Variance: $\frac{\delta K_{\lambda+1}(\delta \gamma)}{\gamma K_\lambda(\delta\gamma)} + \frac{\beta^2\delta^2}{\gamma^2}\left( \frac{K_{\lambda+2}(\delta\gamma)}{K_{\lambda}(\delta\gamma)} - \frac{K_{\lambda+1}^2(\delta\gamma)}{K_{\lambda}^2(\delta\gamma)} \right)$
- MGF: $\frac{e^{\mu z}\gamma^\lambda}{\sqrt{\alpha^2 -(\beta +z)^2}^\lambda} \frac{K_\lambda(\delta \sqrt{\alpha^2 -(\beta +z)^2})}{K_\lambda (\delta \gamma)}$

The generalised hyperbolic distribution (GH) is a continuous probability distribution defined as the normal variance-mean mixture where the mixing distribution is the generalized inverse Gaussian distribution (GIG). Its probability density function (see the box) is given in terms of modified Bessel function of the second kind, denoted by $K_\lambda$. It was introduced by Ole Barndorff-Nielsen, who studied it in the context of physics of wind-blown sand.

== Properties ==
=== Linear transformation ===
This class is closed under affine transformations.

=== Summation ===
Barndorff-Nielsen and Halgreen proved that the GIG distribution is infinitely divisible and since the GH distribution can be obtained as a normal variance-mean mixture where the mixing distribution is the generalized inverse Gaussian distribution, Barndorff-Nielsen and Halgreen showed the GH distribution is infinitely divisible as well.

=== Fails to be convolution-closed ===
An important point about infinitely divisible distributions is their connection to Lévy processes, i.e. at any point in time a Lévy process is infinitely divisibly distributed. Many families of well-known infinitely divisible distributions are so-called convolution-closed, i.e. if the distribution of a Lévy process at one point in time belongs to one of these families, then the distribution of the Lévy process at all points in time belong to the same family of distributions. For example, a Poisson process will be Poisson-distributed at all points in time, or a Brownian motion will be normally distributed at all points in time. However, a Lévy process that is generalised hyperbolic at one point in time might fail to be generalized hyperbolic at another point in time. In fact, the generalized Laplace distributions and the normal inverse Gaussian distributions are the only subclasses of the generalized hyperbolic distributions that are closed under convolution.

== Related distributions ==
As the name suggests it is of a very general form, being the superclass of, among others, the Student's t-distribution, the Laplace distribution, the hyperbolic distribution, the normal-inverse Gaussian distribution and the variance-gamma distribution.

- $\mathrm{GH}(-\tfrac{\nu}{2}, 0, 0, \sqrt{\nu}, \mu)\,$ is a Student's t-distribution with $\nu$ degrees of freedom.
- $\mathrm{GH}(1, \alpha, \beta, \delta, \mu)\,$ is a hyperbolic distribution.
- $\mathrm{GH}(-\tfrac{1}{2}, \alpha, \beta, \delta, \mu)\,$ is a normal-inverse Gaussian distribution (NIG).
- $\mathrm{GH}(\text{?}, \text{?}, \text{?}, \text{?}, \text{?})\,$ normal-inverse chi-squared distribution
- $\mathrm{GH}(\text{?}, \text{?}, \text{?}, \text{?}, \text{?})\,$ normal-inverse gamma distribution (NI)
- $\mathrm{GH}(\lambda, \alpha, \beta, 0, \mu)\,$ is a variance-gamma distribution
- $\mathrm{GH}(1, 1, 0, 0, \mu)\,$ is a Laplace distribution with location parameter $\mu$ and scale parameter 1.

== Applications ==
It is mainly applied to areas that require sufficient probability of far-field behaviour, which it can model due to its semi-heavy tails—a property the normal distribution does not possess. The generalised hyperbolic distribution is often used in economics.
