= Ole Barndorff-Nielsen =

Danish statistician (1935–2022)

Ole Eiler Barndorff-Nielsen
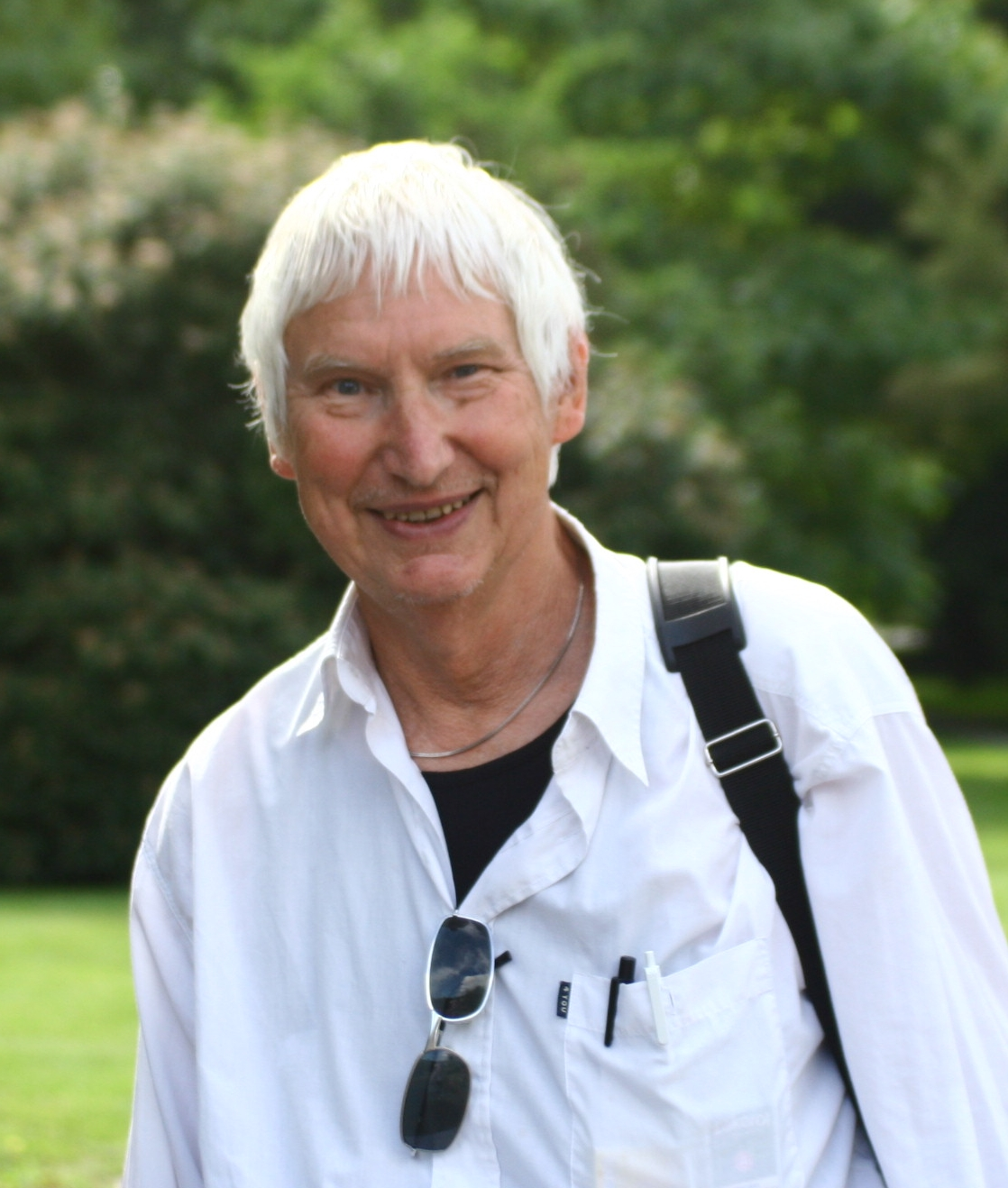
- Ole Barndorff-Nielsen at the Levy conference in Copenhagen in August 2007.
- Born: March 18, 1935; Frederiksberg, Denmark
- Died: June 26, 2022 (aged 87); Aarhus, Denmark
- Education: University of Copenhagen; Aarhus University
- Known for: hyperbolic distribution, Information geometry, maximum likelihood estimator, Lévy processes, Barndorff-Nielsen Shephard stochastic volatility model
- Scientific career
- Fields: Mathematics
- Workplaces: Aarhus University; Technical University of Munich
- Doctoral advisor: Anders Holst Andersen
- Doctoral students: Bent Jørgensen

Ole Eiler Barndorff-Nielsen (18 March 1935 – 26 June 2022) was a Danish statistician who has contributed to many areas of statistical science.

== Education and career ==
He was born in Copenhagen, and became interested in statistics when, as a student of actuarial mathematics at the University of Copenhagen, he worked part-time at the Department of Biostatistics of the Danish State Serum Institute. He graduated from Aarhus University (Denmark) in 1960, where he has spent most of his academic life, and where he became professor of statistics in 1973. However, from 1962 to 1963 and from 1963 to 1964, he stayed at the University of Minnesota and Stanford University, respectively, and from August 1974 to February 1975, he was an Overseas Fellow at Churchill College, Cambridge, and visitor at Statistical Laboratory, Cambridge University.

Barndorff-Nielsen became Professor Emeritus at Aarhus University at the Thiele Centre for Applied Mathematics in Natural Science and affiliated with the Center for Research in Econometric Analysis of Time Series (CREATES) on a part-time basis and since 2008 also affiliated to the Institute of Advanced Studies at the Technical University of Munich.

== Works of Barndorff-Nielsen ==
Among Barndorff-Nielsen's early scientific contributions are his work on exponential families and on the foundations of statistics, in particular sufficiency and conditional inference. In 1977, he introduced the hyperbolic distribution as a mathematical model of the size distribution of sand grains, formalising heuristic ideas proposed by Ralph Alger Bagnold. He also derived the larger class of generalised hyperbolic distributions. These distributions, in particular the normal-inverse Gaussian (NIG) distribution, have later turned out to be useful in many other areas of science, in particular turbulence and finance. The NIG-distribution is now widely used to describe the distribution of returns from financial assets.

In 1984, he produced a short film on the physics of blown sand and the life of the British scientist and explorer Brigadier Ralph Alger Bagnold. A follow-up to the film was produced in 2011 on the studies of stochastics in the physical sciences carried out by Barndorff-Nielsen and colleagues at the Faculty of Science, Aarhus University by the initiative of the President of the Bernoulli Society for Mathematical Statistics and Probability, Professor Victor Pérez-Abreu.

Later Barndorff-Nielsen played a leading role in the application of differential geometry to investigate statistical models. Another main contribution is his work on asymptotic methods in statistics, not least his formula for the conditional distribution of the maximum likelihood estimator given an ancillary statistic that generalizes a formula by Ronald A. Fisher (originally called the $p^*$-formula, but now known as the Barndorff-Nielsen formula). He has jointly with David Cox written two influential books on asymptotic techniques in statistics. Since the mid-90s Barndorff-Nielsen has worked on stochastic models in finance (often with Neil Shephard) and turbulence, on statistical methods for the analysis of data from experiments in quantum physics, and has contributed to the theory of Lévy processes.

== Notable honors and positions held ==
Barndorff-Nielsen is a member of the Royal Danish Academy of Sciences and Letters and of Academia Europaea. He has received honorary doctorate degrees from the Université Paul Sabatier, Toulouse and the Katholieke Universiteit Leuven. In 1993-1995 he was a very influential president of the Bernoulli Society for Mathematical Statistics and Probability. He was the editor of International Statistical Review in 1980-1987 and of the journal Bernoulli in 1994–2000. From 1 April 1998 to 31 March 2003 he was Scientific Director of MaPhySto (the Centre for Mathematical Physics and Stochastics), which was a centre devoted to advanced research and training in the fields of mathematical physics and stochastics, as well as some closely related areas. In 2001 he received the Humboldt Prize and in 2010 the Faculty Price from Faculty of Science, Aarhus University.

== Bibliography ==
- O. E. Barndorff-Nielsen, V. K. Gupta, Victor Pérez-Abreu, and E. Waymire (eds.), Stochastic Methods in Hydrology: Rain, Landforms and Floods, World Scientific Publishing Company 1998
- Ole E Barndorff-Nielsen and Albert Shiryaev, Change of Time and Change of Measure (Second Edition), World Scientific Publishing Company 2015; 1st edition 2010
- Kiyosi Itô (with Ole E Barndorff-Nielsen and Ken-iti Sato as editors), Stochastic Processes: Lectures given at Aarhus University, Springer 2010
- Ole E Barndorff-Nielsen, Thomas Mikosch and Sidney I. Resnick, Lévy Processes: Theory and Applications, Birkhäuser 2013; 2001 edition
- Ole E. Barndorff-Nielsen, Parametric Statistical Models and Likelihood, Springer-Verlag 2012

== See also ==
- Generalised hyperbolic distribution
- Generalized inverse Gaussian distribution
- Hyperbolic distribution
- Information geometry
- List of mathematicians
