= Louis Halphen =

French medievalist and author (1880–1950)

Louis Sigismond Isaac Halphen (4 February 1880 in Paris – 7 October 1950 in Paris) was a French medieval specialist and the author of many important books over a long career. He was noteworthy as the editor of a modern edition of the famous classic Einhard's "Vie de Charlemagne" (Paris, 1947), He was also known as being one of the general editors of the monumental series Peuples et civilisations.

Louis Halphen was born in Paris to mathematician Georges Henri Halphen. He married Germaine Weill, the daughter of Mathieu Weill, in 1910, with whom he had two children: Étienne and Geneviève.

== Selected published books ==
- Le comté d'Anjou au XIe siècle, 1906
  - review by S Fanning in Speculum, 1985 "...The essential works on Anjou in this period are Louis Halphen, Le comte d'Anjou au XIe siecle (Paris, 1906) JSTOR
- La Conquête romaine (with A Piganiol,& P Sagnac (1926) - Presses universitaires de France
- Charlemagne et l'empire carolingien, 1947
  - translated into English as Charlemagne and the Carolingian Empire, (1977) North-Holland Pub. Co
  - translated into Spanish as Carlomagno y el imperio carolingio, Unión Tipográfica Editorial Hispano Americana (1955)
- Études sur l'administration de Rome au Moyen Âge (751-1252), (1972) Multigrafica Editrice
- À travers l'histoire du Moyen âge, (1950) - Presses universitaires de France

== Bibliography ==
- S. Woolf, "Europe and its Historians" Contemporary European History (2003), 12: 323-337 Cambridge University Press
- Edward R. Tannenbaum "French Scholarship in Modern European History: New Developments since 1945" The Journal of Modern History, Vol. 29, No. 3 (Sep., 1957), pp. 246–252 JSTOR
- Mélanges d'histoire du Moyen âge, dédiés à la mémoire de Louis Halphen : Paris : Presses universitaires de France, 1951.
