= Georges Henri Halphen =

19th-century French mathematician

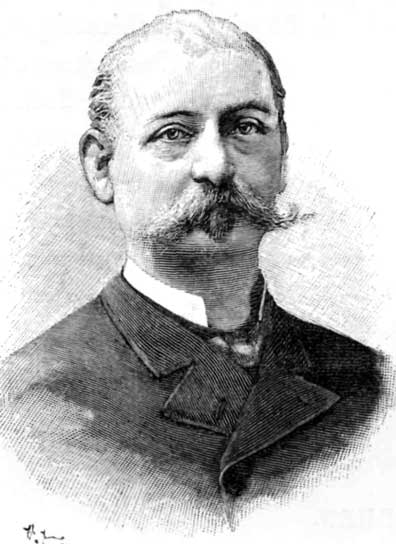
- Born: 30 October 1844; Rouen, France
- Died: 23 May 1889 (aged 44); Versailles, France
- Education: École Polytechnique
- Spouse: Rose Marguerite Aron
- Scientific career
- Fields: Mathematics
- Thesis: Sur les invariants différentiels (1878)

Georges Henri Halphen (French: [ʒɔʀʒ ɑ̃ʁi alfɛn]; 30 October 1844 – 23 May 1889) was a French mathematician. He was known for his work in geometry, particularly in enumerative geometry and the singularity theory of algebraic curves, in algebraic geometry. He also worked on invariant theory and projective differential geometry.

== Biography ==
He did his studies at École Polytechnique (X 1862), where he graduated in 1866. He continued his education at École d'Application de l'Artillerie et du Génie de Metz. As a lieutenant of Artillery he was sent Auxonne first and then to Strasbourg. In 1872, Halphen settled in Paris, where he became a lecturer at the École Polytechnique and began his scientific studies. He completed his dissertation in 1878. In 1872 he married Rose Marguerite Aron, with whom he had eight children, four sons and four daughters. Of the four sons, three joined the military and two of them died in World War I. Louis Halphen (1880-1950) was a French historian specialized in medivial times; Charles Halphen (1885-1915), was deputy secretary of the Société mathématique de France. One of his grandsons was Étienne Halphen (1911–1954), who did significant work in applied statistics.

== Awards ==
Georges-Henri Halphen received in the Steiner prize of the Prussian Academy of Sciences in 1882 along with Max Noether. In 1881 Halphen received the Grand Prix of the Académie des sciences for his work on linear differential equations: Mémoire sur la Reduction des Equations Différentielles Linéaires aux Formes Intégrales. He received the Prix Poncelet in 1883 and the Prix Petit d'Ormoy in 1885. He was elected to the Académie des sciences in 1886 in the Section de Géométrie, replacing the deceased Jean Claude Bouquet. In 1887 Halphen was elected to the Accademia dei Lincei in Rome.

== Works ==
- Oeuvres de G.H. Halphen, in 4 vols. edited by Camille Jordan, Henri Poincaré, Charles Émile Picard with assistance from Ernest Vessiot, 1916, 1918, 1921, 1924, Paris, France: Gauthier-Villars
- Traité des fonctions elliptiques et de leurs applications, 3 vols., 1886, 1888, 1891 (in vol. 2 applications to physics, geometry, the theory of integrals, and geodesy; in vol. 3 applications to algebra, especially the quintic equation, number theory — vol. 3 consists merely of fragments)

An overview of Halphen's work is provided by Laurent Gruson and a complete list of the works was compiled by Camille Jordan as part of Halphen's obituary in Journal de Mathématiques Pures et Appliquées.

== See also ==
- Bézout's theorem
- Cramer's paradox
