= Normal-inverse Gaussian distribution =

Continuous probability distribution

Normal-inverse Gaussian (NIG)
- Parameters: $\mu$ location (real) $\alpha$ tail heaviness (real) $\beta$ asymmetry parameter (real) $\delta$ scale parameter (real) $\gamma = \sqrt{\alpha^2 - \beta^2}$
- Support: $x \in (-\infty; +\infty)\!$
- PDF: $\frac{\alpha\delta K_1 \left(\alpha\sqrt{\delta^2 + (x - \mu)^2}\right)}{\pi \sqrt{\delta^2 + (x - \mu)^2}} \; e^{\delta \gamma + \beta (x - \mu)}$ $K_j$ denotes a modified Bessel function of the second kind
- Mean: $\mu + \delta \beta / \gamma$
- Variance: $\delta\alpha^2/\gamma^3$
- Skewness: $3 \beta /\sqrt{\alpha^2\delta \gamma}$
- Excess kurtosis: $3(1+4 \beta^2/\alpha^2)/(\delta\gamma)$
- MGF: $e^{\mu z + \delta (\gamma - \sqrt{\alpha^2 -(\beta +z)^2})}$
- CF: $e^{i\mu z + \delta (\gamma - \sqrt{\alpha^2 -(\beta +iz)^2})}$

The normal-inverse Gaussian distribution (NIG, also known as the normal-Wald distribution) is a continuous probability distribution that is defined as the normal variance-mean mixture where the mixing density is the inverse Gaussian distribution. The NIG distribution was noted by Blaesild in 1977 as a subclass of the generalised hyperbolic distribution discovered by Ole Barndorff-Nielsen. In the next year Barndorff-Nielsen published the NIG in another paper. It was introduced in the mathematical finance literature in 1997.

The parameters of the normal-inverse Gaussian distribution are often used to construct a heaviness and skewness plot called the NIG-triangle.

== Properties ==
=== Moments ===
The fact that there is a simple expression for the moment generating function implies that simple expressions for all moments are available.

=== Linear transformation ===
This class is closed under affine transformations, since it is a particular case of the Generalized hyperbolic distribution, which has the same property. If
$$x\sim\mathcal{NIG}(\alpha,\beta,\delta,\mu) \text{ and } y=ax+b,$$
then
$$y\sim\mathcal{NIG}\bigl(\frac{\alpha}{\left|a\right|},\frac{\beta}{a},\left|a\right|\delta,a\mu+b\bigr).$$

=== Summation ===
This class is infinitely divisible, since it is a particular case of the Generalized hyperbolic distribution, which has the same property.

=== Convolution ===
The class of normal-inverse Gaussian distributions is closed under convolution in the following sense: if $X_1$ and $X_2$ are independent random variables that are NIG-distributed with the same values of the parameters $\alpha$ and $\beta$, but possibly different values of the location and scale parameters, $\mu_1$, $\delta_1$ and $\mu_2,$ $\delta_2$, respectively, then $X_1 + X_2$ is NIG-distributed with parameters $\alpha$, $\beta$, $\mu_1 + \mu_2$ and $\delta_1 + \delta_2.$

== Related distributions ==
The class of NIG distributions is a flexible system of distributions that includes fat-tailed and skewed distributions, and the normal distribution, $N(\mu,\sigma^2),$ arises as a special case by setting $\beta=0, \delta=\sigma^2\alpha,$ and letting $\alpha\rightarrow\infty$.

== Stochastic process ==
The normal-inverse Gaussian distribution can also be seen as the marginal distribution of the normal-inverse Gaussian process which provides an alternative way of explicitly constructing it. Starting with a drifting Brownian motion (Wiener process), $W^{(\gamma)}(t)=W(t)+\gamma t$, we can define the inverse Gaussian process $A_t = \inf\{s>0:W^{(\gamma)}(s)=\delta t\}.$ Then given a second independent drifting Brownian motion, $W^{(\beta)}(t)=\tilde W(t)+\beta t$, the normal-inverse Gaussian process is the time-changed process $X_t = W^{(\beta)}(A_t)$. The process $X(t)$ at time $t=1$ has the normal-inverse Gaussian distribution described above. The NIG process is a particular instance of the more general class of Lévy processes.

== As a variance-mean mixture ==
Let $\mathcal{IG}$ denote the inverse Gaussian distribution and $\mathcal{N}$ denote the normal distribution. Let $z\sim\mathcal{IG}(\delta,\gamma)$, where $\gamma = \sqrt{\alpha^2-\beta^2}$; and let $x\sim\mathcal{N}(\mu+\beta z,z)$, then $x$ follows the NIG distribution, with parameters, $\alpha,\beta,\delta,\mu$. This can be used to generate NIG variates by ancestral sampling. It can also be used to derive an EM algorithm for maximum-likelihood estimation of the NIG parameters.
