= Autologistic actor attribute models =

Progression of the flu (contagion) on a social network

Autologistic actor attribute models (ALAAMs) are a group of statistical models designed to analyze how traits or characteristics (node attributes) of individuals (nodes) in a network are influenced by their connections. Commonly applied to social network data, ALAAMs study social influence—how relationships within a network shape individual outcomes, such as behaviors or beliefs. They typically focus on binary outcomes (e.g., yes/no traits), though they can also handle ordinal (ordered categories) or continuous (numerical) attributes as the variables being explained (dependent variables). By modeling these attribute patterns, ALAAMs help reveal how network ties affect personal characteristics across various types of networks.

== Background ==
Autologistic actor attributes models (ALAAMs) are a method for social network analysis. They were originally proposed as alteration of Exponential Random Graph Models (ERGMs) to allow for the study of social influence. ERGMs are a family of statistical models for modeling social selection, how ties within a network form on the basis of node attributes and other ties in the network. ALAAMs adapt the structure of ERGM models, but rather than predicting tie formation based on fixed node attributes, they predict node attributes based on fixed ties. This allows for the modeling of social influence processes, for instance how friendship among adolescents (network ties) may influence whether they smoke (node attributes), influences of networks on other health-related practices, and how attitudes or perceived attitudes may change.

== Definition ==
ALAAMs, like ERGMs, are part of the Exponential family of probability models. ALAAMs are exponential models that describe, for a network, a joint probability distribution for whether or not each node in the network exhibits a certain node-level attribute.

$P(Y = y | \theta , X) = \frac{\exp(\theta^{T} s(y,X))}{c(\theta)}$

where $\theta$ is a vector of weights, associated with $s(y,X)$, the vector of model parameters, and $c(\theta)$ is a normalization constant to ensure that the probabilities of all possible combination of node attributes sum to one.

== Estimation ==
Estimation of model parameters, and evaluation of standard errors (for the purposes of hypothesis testing), is conducted using Markov chain Monte Carlo maximum likelihood estimation (MCMC-MLE), building on approaches such as the Metropolis–Hastings algorithm. Such approaches are required to estimate the model's parameters across an intractable sample space for moderately-size networks. After model estimation, goodness-of-fit testing, through the sampling of random networks from the fitted model, should be performed to ensure that the model adequately fits the observed data.

ALAAM estimation, while not perfect, has been demonstrated to be relatively robust to partially missing data, due to random sampling or snowball sampling data collection techniques.

== Software ==
Currently, these algorithms for estimating ALAAMs are implemented in the MPNet software, published by MelNet, a research group at the University of Melbourne and Swinburne University of Technology.

Recently, the software of a Melbourne-based research group has incorporated a multilevel approach for ALAAMs in their MPNet software for directed and undirected networks, as well as valued ties (dyadic attributes). The software strictly does not accept missing variables. Cases will need to be deleted if one of their nodal variables is missing. The software is also not able to study ties 'out of the network cluster.' For example: when pupils in classes not only mention friends in their class, but also friends outside of the class(/school).

R code for Bayesian ALAAMs is available from https://github.com/johankoskinen/ALAAM. ALAAMEE is Python software for ALAAM parameter estimation, simulation, and goodness-of-fit testing.

ALAAMs are distinct from other models of social influence on networks, such as epidemic/SIR models or RSiena, because ALAAMs are used for the analysis of cross-sectional data, observed at only a single point in time.

An alternative to this model to study a nodal attribute as a dependent variable in cross-sectional data is the Multiple Membership model extension for network analysis (can also be extended to make it longitudinal). Unlike ALAAM, it can be used on a continuous dependent variable, is able to handle missingness, can make use of multiple networks (multiplex) and can take ties 'out of the cluster' into account as well.
