= Normal variance-mean mixture =

Probability distribution

In probability theory and statistics, a normal variance-mean mixture with mixing probability density $g$ is the continuous probability distribution of a random variable $Y$ of the form

$$Y=\alpha + \beta V+\sigma \sqrt{V}X,$$

where $\alpha$, $\beta$ and $\sigma > 0$ are real numbers, and random variables $X$ and $V$ are independent, $X$ is normally distributed with mean zero and variance one, and $V$ is continuously distributed on the positive half-axis with probability density function $g$. The conditional distribution of $Y$ given $V$ is thus a normal distribution with mean $\alpha + \beta V$ and variance $\sigma^2 V$. A normal variance-mean mixture can be thought of as the distribution of a certain quantity in an inhomogeneous population consisting of many different normal distributed subpopulations. It is the distribution of the position of a Wiener process (Brownian motion) with drift $\beta$ and infinitesimal variance $\sigma^2$ observed at a random time point independent of the Wiener process and with probability density function $g$. An important example of normal variance-mean mixtures is the generalised hyperbolic distribution in which the mixing distribution is the generalized inverse Gaussian distribution.

The probability density function of a normal variance-mean mixture with mixing probability density $g$ is

$$f(x) = \int_0^\infty \frac{1}{\sqrt{2 \pi \sigma^2 v}} \exp \left( \frac{-(x - \alpha - \beta v)^2}{2 \sigma^2 v} \right) g(v) \, dv$$

and its moment generating function is

$$M(s) = \exp(\alpha  s) \, M_g \left(\beta s + \frac12 \sigma^2 s^2 \right),$$

where $M_g$ is the moment generating function of the probability distribution with density function $g$, i.e.

$$M_g(s) = E\left(\exp( s V)\right) = \int_0^\infty \exp(s v) g(v) \, dv.$$

== See also ==
- Normal-inverse Gaussian distribution
- Variance-gamma distribution
- Generalised hyperbolic distribution
