= Mathieu Weill =

French mathematician (1851–1939)

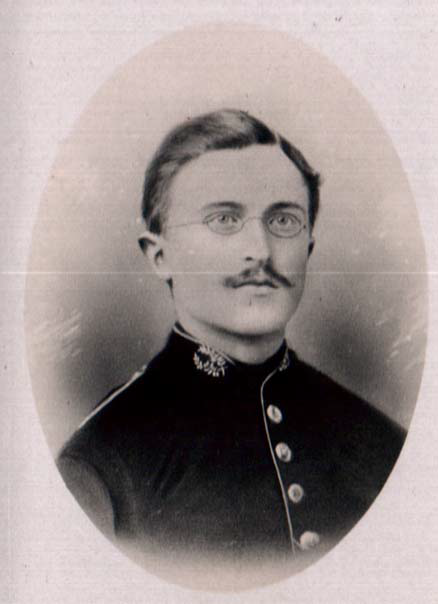
- Born: Isaac Mathieu Weill; 24 May 1851; Haguenau, Alsace, France
- Died: 5 November 1939 (aged 88); Paris, France
- Resting place: Montparnasse Cemetery
- Education: École Polytechnique
- Spouse: Delphine Lévi (m. 1878; died 1938)
- Scientific career
- Workplaces: Collège Chaptal

Isaac Mathieu Weill (24 May 1851 – 5 November 1939) was a French mathematician and principal of the Collège Chaptal.

== Biography ==
Mathieu Weill was born to a Jewish family in Haguenau, the son of Valentine and Isidore Weill, a mathematics teacher. He was educated in the lyceums of Burg and Strasburg, and was admitted to the École Polytechnique in 1870. He received a degree in mathematics in November 1872, and a degree in physical sciences in November 1876. Meanwhile, Weill began studies at the military school in Fontainebleau in 1872. He attained the rank of lieutenant of artillery, but resigned in April 1877.

He married Delphine Lévi in 1878, with whom he had four children. That same year, he became a lecturer at the Collège Chaptal at Paris. He was appointed professor of mathematics in 1881, and in October 1898 the school's principal. He was appointed Chevalier of the Legion of Honour on 28 February 1904.

== Publications ==
Weill published several essays in French mathematical journals, including the Nouvelles Annales de Mathématiques and the Bulletin de la Société Mathématique de France. He was the author of "Cours de Géométrie Analytique" (1888) and of "Précis d'Arithmétique, de Géométrie, d'Algèbre, de Trigonométrie," in four volumes (1895–1897).
