= Generalized inverse Gaussian distribution =

Family of continuous probability distributions

Generalized inverse Gaussian
- Probability density function
- Parameters: a > 0, b > 0, p real
- Support: x > 0
- PDF: $f(x) = \frac{(a/b)^{p/2}}{2 K_p(\sqrt{ab})} x^{(p-1)} e^{-(ax + b/x)/2}$
- Mean: $\operatorname{E}[x]=\frac{\sqrt{b}\ K_{p+1}(\sqrt{a b}) }{ \sqrt{a}\ K_{p}(\sqrt{a b})}$ $\operatorname{E}[x^{-1}]=\frac{\sqrt{a}\ K_{p+1}(\sqrt{a b}) }{ \sqrt{b}\ K_{p}(\sqrt{a b})}-\frac{2p}{b}$ $\operatorname{E}[\ln x]=\ln \frac{\sqrt{b}}{\sqrt{a}}+\frac{\partial}{\partial p} \ln K_{p}(\sqrt{a b})$
- Mode: $\frac{(p-1)+\sqrt{(p-1)^2+ab}}{a}$
- Variance: $\left(\frac{b}{a}\right)\left[\frac{K_{p+2}(\sqrt{ab})}{K_p(\sqrt{ab})}-\left(\frac{K_{p+1}(\sqrt{ab})}{K_p(\sqrt{ab})}\right)^2\right]$
- MGF: $\left(\frac{a}{a-2t}\right)^{\frac{p}{2}}\frac{K_p(\sqrt{b(a-2t)})}{K_p(\sqrt{ab})}$
- CF: $\left(\frac{a}{a-2it}\right)^{\frac{p}{2}}\frac{K_p(\sqrt{b(a-2it)})}{K_p(\sqrt{ab})}$

In probability theory and statistics, the generalized inverse Gaussian distribution (GIG) is a three-parameter family of continuous probability distributions with probability density function

$$f(x) = \frac{(a/b)^{p/2}}{2 K_p(\sqrt{ab})} x^{(p-1)} e^{-(ax + b/x)/2},\qquad x>0,$$

where K_{p} is a modified Bessel function of the second kind, a > 0, b > 0 and p a real parameter. It is used extensively in geostatistics, statistical linguistics, finance, etc. This distribution was first proposed by Étienne Halphen. It was rediscovered and popularised by Ole Barndorff-Nielsen, who called it the generalized inverse Gaussian distribution. Its statistical properties are discussed in Bent Jørgensen's lecture notes.

== Properties ==
=== Alternative parametrization ===
By setting $\theta = \sqrt{ab}$ and $\eta = \sqrt{b/a}$, we can alternatively express the GIG distribution as

$$f(x) = \frac{1}{2\eta K_p(\theta)} \left(\frac{x}{\eta}\right)^{p-1} e^{-\theta(x/\eta + \eta/x)/2},$$

where $\theta$ is the concentration parameter while $\eta$ is the scaling parameter.

=== Summation ===
Barndorff-Nielsen and Halgreen proved that the GIG distribution is infinitely divisible.

=== Entropy ===
The entropy of the generalized inverse Gaussian distribution is given as

$$\begin{align}
H = \frac{1}{2} \log \left( \frac b a \right) & {} +\log \left(2 K_p\left(\sqrt{ab} \right)\right) - (p-1) \frac{\left[\frac{d}{d\nu}K_\nu\left(\sqrt{ab}\right)\right]_{\nu=p}}{K_p\left(\sqrt{a b}\right)} \\
& {} + \frac{\sqrt{a b}}{2 K_p\left(\sqrt{a b}\right)}\left( K_{p+1}\left(\sqrt{ab}\right) + K_{p-1}\left(\sqrt{a b}\right)\right)
\end{align}$$

where $\left[\frac{d}{d\nu}K_\nu\left(\sqrt{a b}\right)\right]_{\nu=p}$ is a derivative of the modified Bessel function of the second kind with respect to the order $\nu$ evaluated at $\nu=p$

=== Characteristic function ===
The characteristic of a random variable $X\sim GIG(p, a, b)$ is given as

$$E(e^{itX}) =  \left(\frac{a }{a-2it }\right)^{\frac{p}{2}} \frac{K_{p}\left( \sqrt{(a-2it)b} \right)}{ K_{p}\left( \sqrt{ab} \right) }$$

for $t \in \mathbb{R}$ where $i$ denotes the imaginary unit.

== Related distributions ==
=== Special cases ===
The inverse Gaussian and gamma distributions are special cases of the generalized inverse Gaussian distribution for p = −1/2 and b = 0, respectively. Specifically, an inverse Gaussian distribution of the form

$$f(x;\mu,\lambda) = \left[\frac{\lambda}{2 \pi x^3}\right]^{1/2} \exp{ \left( \frac{-\lambda (x-\mu)^2}{2 \mu^2 x} \right)}$$

is a GIG with $a = \lambda/\mu^2$, $b = \lambda$, and $p=-1/2$. A gamma distribution of the form

$$g(x;\alpha,\beta) = \beta^\alpha \frac 1 {\Gamma(\alpha)} x^{\alpha-1} e^{-\beta x}$$
is a GIG with $a = 2 \beta$, $b = 0$, and $p = \alpha$.

Other special cases include the inverse-gamma distribution, for a = 0.

=== Conjugate prior for Gaussian ===
The GIG distribution is conjugate to the normal distribution when serving as the mixing distribution in a normal variance-mean mixture. Let the prior distribution for some hidden variable, say $z$, be GIG:
$$P(z\mid a,b,p) = \operatorname{GIG}(z\mid a,b,p)$$
and let there be $T$ observed data points, $X=x_1,\ldots,x_T$, with normal likelihood function, conditioned on $z:$

$$P(X\mid z,\alpha,\beta) = \prod_{i=1}^T N(x_i\mid\alpha+\beta z,z)$$

where $N(x\mid\mu,v)$ is the normal distribution, with mean $\mu$ and variance $v$. Then the posterior for $z$, given the data is also GIG:
$$P(z\mid X,a,b,p,\alpha,\beta) = \text{GIG}\left(z\mid a+T\beta^2,b+S,p-\frac T 2 \right)$$
where $S = \sum_{i=1}^T (x_i-\alpha)^2$. (Note: Due to the conjugacy, these details can be derived without solving integrals, by noting that $$P(z\mid X,a,b,p,\alpha,\beta)\propto P(z\mid a,b,p)P(X\mid z,\alpha,\beta)$$. Omitting all factors independent of $z$, the right-hand-side can be simplified to give an un-normalized GIG distribution, from which the posterior parameters can be identified.)

=== Sichel distribution ===
The Sichel distribution results when the GIG is used as the mixing distribution for the Poisson parameter $\lambda$.

== See also ==
- Inverse Gaussian distribution
- Gamma distribution
