= Special Interest Group on Information Retrieval =

Subgroup of the Association for Computing Machinery

ACM Special Interest Group on Information Retrieval
- Parent organization: Association for Computing Machinery
- Website: sigir.org

SIGIR is the Association for Computing Machinery's Special Interest Group on Information Retrieval. The scope of the group's specialty is the theory and application of computers to the acquisition, organization, storage, retrieval and distribution of information; emphasis is placed on working with non-numeric information, ranging from natural language to highly structured data bases.

== Conferences ==
The annual international SIGIR conference, which began in 1978, is considered the most important in the field of information retrieval. SIGIR also sponsors the annual Joint Conference on Digital Libraries (JCDL) in association with SIGWEB, the Conference on Information and Knowledge Management (CIKM), and the International Conference on Web Search and Data Mining (WSDM) in association with SIGKDD, SIGMOD, and SIGWEB.

=== SIGIR conference locations ===
Number	Year	Location
21	1998	Melbourne
22	1999	Berkeley, California
23	2000	Athens
24	2001	New Orleans
25	2002	Tampere
26	2003	Toronto
27	2004	Sheffield
28	2005	Salvador, Bahia
29	2006	Seattle
30	2007	Amsterdam
31	2008	Singapore
32	2009	Boston
33	2010	Geneva
34	2011	Beijing
35	2012	Portland, Oregon
36	2013	Dublin
37	2014	Gold Coast, Queensland
38	2015	Santiago
39	2016	Pisa
40	2017	Tokyo
41	2018	Ann Arbor
42	2019	Paris
43	2020	Xi'an, China
44	2021	Montreal
45	2022	Madrid
46	2023	Taipei
47	2024	Washington, D.C.
48	2025	Padova, Italy
49	2026	Naarm, Melbourne

== Awards ==
The group gives out several awards to contributions to the field of information retrieval. The most important award is the Gerard Salton Award (named after the computer scientist Gerard Salton), which is awarded every three years to an individual who has made "significant, sustained and continuing contributions to research in information retrieval".

Additionally, SIGIR presents a Best Paper Award to recognize the highest quality paper at each conference. "Test of time" Award is a recent award that is given to a paper that has had "long-lasting influence, including impact on a subarea of information retrieval research, across subareas of information retrieval research, and outside of the information retrieval research community". This award is selected from a set of full papers presented at the main SIGIR conference 10–12 years before.

=== SIGIR Academy ===
The SIGIR Academy is a group of researchers honored by ACM Special Interest Group on Information Retrieval. Each year, 3-5 new members are elected (in addition to other "very senior members of the IR community" who will be "automatically" inducted) for having made significant, cumulative contributions to the development of the field of information retrieval and influencing the research of others. These are the principal leaders of the field, whose efforts have shaped the discipline and/or industry through significant research, innovation, and/or service.

==== History ====
The SIGIR Academy was established in 2021 by the Association for Computing Machinery's Special Interest Group on Information Retrieval (SIGIR) to recognize individuals who have made significant cumulative contributions to the field of information retrieval.

==== Inductees by year ====
Here are the inductees into the SIGIR Academy by year:

Year	New members
2021	James Allan, Ricardo Baeza-Yates, Nicholas Belkin, Andrei Broder, Jamie Callan, William Cooper, W. Bruce Croft, Susan Dumais, Edward Fox, Ophir Frieder, Norbert Fuhr, Marti Hearst, Kalervo Järvelin, Thorsten Joachims, Noriko Kando, Diane Kelly, Michael Lesk, Yoelle Maarek, Alistair Moffat, Marc Najork, C.J. van Rijsbergen, Stephen Robertson, Tefko Saracevic, Ellen Voorhees, ChengXiang Zhai
2022	Charles L. A. Clarke, William Hersh, Jian-Yun Nie, Maarten de Rijke, Jaime Teevan, Justin Zobel
2023	Nick Craswell, Nicola Ferro, Jimmy Lin, Tetsuya Sakai, Ryen W. White, Yiming Yang
2024	Fernando Diaz, Donna Harman, Mounia Lalmas, Mark Sanderson, Yiqun Liu
2025	David Carmel, Evgeniy Gabrilovich, Don Metzler, Chirag Shah, Ian Soboroff, Min Zhang
2026	Jiafeng Guo, David Hawking, Iadh Ounis
