= Agosti =

Agosti is an Italian patronymic surname. Notable people with the surname include:

- Antonio Pacheco D'Agosti (born 1976), Uruguayan footballer
- Carlos Agostí (1922–2002), Spanish-born Mexican film actor
- Deborah Agosti (born c. 1952), American judge from Nevada
- Ghigo Agosti (1936–2024), Italian singer, musician, and composer
- Guido Agosti (1901–1989), Italian pianist and piano teacher
- Livia Leu Agosti (born 1961), Swiss diplomat
- Lucilla Agosti (born 1978), Italian radio and television presenter and actress
- Mario Agosti (1904–1992), Italian athlete
- Maristella Agosti, Italian information engineer
- Orlando Ramón Agosti (1924–1997), Argentine air force general
- Silvano Agosti (born 1938), Italian film director
