= David Carmel =

Israeli computer scientist (born 1955)

- דוד כרמל
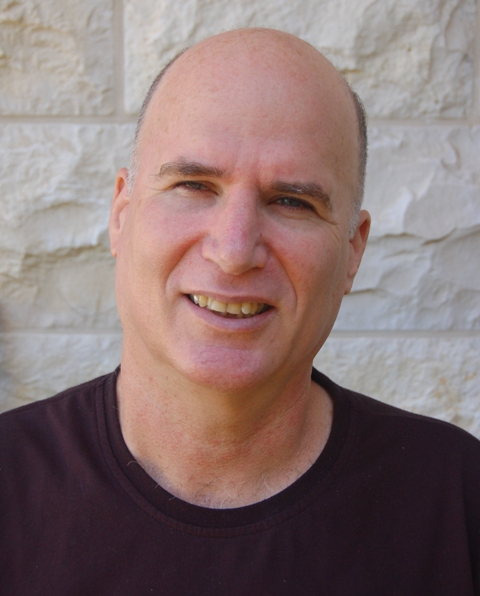
- Born: August 12, 1955 (age 70), Beit HaShita, Israel
- Known for: Information Retrieval
- Scientific career
- Institutions: TII, Amazon, Yahoo, IBM, Technion – Israel Institute of Technology
- Website: https://davidcarmel.org/

David Carmel (born 1955) is an Israeli computer scientist specializing in Information retrieval (IR). He is a Distinguished Researcher at the Technology Innovation Institute (TII) in Haifa, where his research focuses on IR and generative AI. David is also a Senior Research Fellow at the Technion – Israel Institute of Technology.

He is an ACM Distinguished Member since 2016 and an SIGIR Academy member since 2025.

== Early years ==
David Carmel was born in 1955 in Kibbutz Beit HaShita, Israel, to his parents Dan and Elka Carmel. He learned computer science at the Technion – Israel Institute of Technology, specializing in artificial intelligence and multi-agent systems. David completed his PhD in 1997 under the supervision of Shaul Markovitch.

== Career ==
Upon graduating, David Carmel joined IBM Haifa Research Labs, working on information retrieval system. He led the team that achieved the best Precision@10 score at the TREC conference in the “ad-hoc” Web search track in 2001. Another area he explored was efficiency, first with static index pruning, published with Ronald Fagin, Yoelle Maarek and others at SIGIR 2001, and with dynamic pruning based on the WAND algorithm published at CIKM 2003, jointly with Andrei Broder and others. The WAND algorithm was extended later by many other researchers in the community, and is cited by more than 550 academic papers.

David Carmel contributed to the development of the XML Fragments query language, which adopted a classical IR approach for XML search by embedding the XML query and the XML fragments into the same search space. The XML search engine, relying on XML Fragments, achieved top results at the INEX competition over the years 2002–2006.

Another major area of David's research was query difficulty estimation. David, jointly with Dr. Elad Yom-Tov, published a book entitled Estimating the Query Difficulty for Information Retrieval. David's paper on “Learning to Estimate the Query Difficulty”, together with Elad Yom-Tov and others, earned the best paper award at SIGIR 2005. This research direction had led to a long collaboration with Prof. Oren Kurland and his students at the Technion.

David Carmel contributed to the IBM Watson project, which competed against human champions on the television quiz show Jeopardy! The significant public interest in this project resulted in several interviews and articles in the Israeli local media.

David joined Yahoo Labs in 2013 and contributed to multiple research efforts, in particular, devising a new ranking algorithm for Web Mail Search, that were deployed in Yahoo mail and helped revive a dormant area of research.

Between 2017 and 2023, David served as a Principal Applied Scientist at Amazon, where he worked on voice product question answering with Alexa (Amazon's voice assistant). The results of this research were deployed in Alexa's product question asnwering and led to several publications.

Since 2024, David has been serving as a Distinguished Researcher at the Technology Innovation Institute (TII), focusing on Retrieval Augmented Generation (RAG) for Large Language Model, thus combining his early days’ experience with AI and his current interest in search.

== Teaching and Academia ==
Throughout his industrial career, David maintained ties with academia. He was a part-time lecturer for several years in courses on artificial intelligence and information retrieval in the Department of Computer Science at the University of Haifa. As of 2024, he was appointed as a Senior Research Fellow at the Technion, in the Faculty of Data and Decision Sciences, supervising MsC and PhD students.

== Publications ==
Dr. David Carmel has published more than 150 papers in leading international journals and conferences, including SIGIR, WWW, Wed Search and Data Mining (WSDM), and CIKM. He is listed as the inventor on more than 60 patents registered in the United States and internationally.
