= ICAI (disambiguation) =

ICAI is the acronym of Institute of Chartered Accountants of India, the national professional accounting body of India.

ICAI may also refer to:

- Independent Commission for Aid Impact, a British public body asked with the scrutiny of UK foreign aid
- ICAI School of Engineering, school of engineering located in Madrid, Spain
- Innovation Center for Artificial Intelligence, a Dutch network in the area of artificial intelligence
