= Christine L. Borgman =

American Information Studies professor

- Education: Stanford University, University of Pittsburgh, Michigan State University
- Known for: Work on scholarly communication, scientific information, and bibliometrics
- Awards: American Association for the Advancement for Science Fellow, Best Information Science book of the year award from the American Society for Information Science and Technology Association for Information Science and Technology Award for Merit, 2019
- Scientific career
- Fields: Information science
- Workplaces: University of California, Los Angeles

Christine L. Borgman is a distinguished Professor and Presidential Chair in Information Studies at UCLA. She is the author of more than 300 publications in the fields of information studies, computer science, and communication.

== Education ==
She holds a Ph.D. in Communication from Stanford University, Master of Library Science from the University of Pittsburgh, and B.A. in Mathematics from Michigan State University.

== Reception ==
Deborah Karpuk called From Gutenberg to the Global Information Infrastructure (2000) an "outstanding contribution" to the subject of library and information services.

== Academic awards ==
Scholarship in the Digital Age: Information, Infrastructure, and the Internet (MIT Press, 2007) and From Gutenberg to the Global Information Infrastructure: Access to Information in a Networked World (MIT Press, 2000), have won the Best Information Science Book of the Year award from the American Society for Information Science and Technology.

In 2010, she received the Research in Information Science Award from the American Association of Information Science and Technology.

Borgman was the 2011 recipient of the Paul Evan Peters Award from the Coalition for Networked Information, Association of Research Libraries, and EDUCAUSE.

Borgman received the Award of Merit from the Association for Information Science and Technology in 2019.

== Memberships ==
In April of 2025, it was announced that Borgman was elected to the American Academy of Arts and Sciences.

In 2013, she became a fellow of the Association for Computing Machinery.

== Partial bibliography ==
- Effective online searching : a basic text (M. Dekker, 1984). ISBN 978-0-8247-7142-3.
- Scholarly communication and bibliometrics (Sage, 1990).
- The Convergence of Information Science and Communication: a Bibliometric Analysis (Journal of the Association for Information Science and Technology, 1992).
- From Acting Locally to Thinking Globally: A Brief History of Library Automation (Library Quarterly, 1997).
- From Gutenberg to the global information infrastructure : access to information in the networked world (MIT Press, 2000).
- Digital Libraries as Instructional Aids for Knowledge Construction (Educational Technology, 2002) co-authored with Mayer, Richard E.; Smith, Terrence R.; Smart, Laura J.
- Scholarship in the Digital Age: Information, Infrastructure, and the Internet (MIT Press, 2007). ISBN 978-0-262-02619-2.
- The Conundrum of Sharing Research Data (Journal of the American Society for Information Science & Technology, 2012).
- Big Data, Little Data, No Data: Scholarship in the Networked World (MIT Press, 2015).
- Open Data, Grey Data, and Stewardship: Universities at the Privacy Frontier (Berkeley Technology Law Journal, 2018).
- From Data Processes to Data Products: Knowledge Infrastructures in Astronomy (Harvard Data Science Review, 2021).
- Libraries, Digital Libraries, and Data: 30 Years of Development in Central Europe [Keynote presentation] (International Conference on Theory and Practice of Digital Libraries, 2024).
