= CLIR =

CLIR may refer to:

- Council on Library and Information Resources, USA
- Cross-language information retrieval
- Calling line identification restriction, one of the elements of the Caller ID system
