= Gerard Salton =

American computer scientist (1927-1995)

- Born: Gerhard Anton Sahlmann; March 8, 1927; Nuremberg, Germany
- Died: August 28, 1995 (aged 68); Ithaca, New York, US
- Education: Brooklyn College; Harvard University
- Known for: the father of Information Retrieval; Gerard Salton Award
- Scientific career
- Fields: information retrieval
- Workplaces: Cornell University
- Thesis: An automatic data processing system for public utility revenue accounting (1958)
- Doctoral advisor: Howard Aiken
- Doctoral students: Amit Singhal; Ellen Voorhees; James Allan

Gerard A. "Gerry" Salton (8 March 1927 – 28 August 1995) was a professor of computer science at Cornell University. Salton was perhaps the leading computer scientist working in the field of information retrieval during his time, and "the father of Information Retrieval". His group at Cornell developed the SMART Information Retrieval System, which he initiated when he was at Harvard. It was the first system to use the now popular vector space model for information retrieval.

== Education and career ==
Salton was born Gerhard Anton Sahlmann in Nuremberg, Germany. He came to the United States in 1947 and was naturalized in 1952. He received a Bachelor's (1950) and Master's (1952) degree in mathematics from Brooklyn College, and a Ph.D. from Harvard in applied mathematics in 1958, the last of Howard Aiken's doctoral students, and taught there until 1965, when he joined Cornell University and co-founded its department of Computer Science.

Salton was perhaps most well known for developing the now widely used vector space model for Information Retrieval. In this model, both documents and queries are represented as vectors of term counts, and the similarity between a document and a query is given by the cosine between the term vector and the document vector. In this paper, he also introduced TF-IDF, or term-frequency-inverse-document frequency, a model in which the score of a term in a document is the ratio of the number of terms in that document divided by the frequency of the number of documents in which that term occurs. (The concept of inverse document frequency, a measure of specificity, had been introduced in 1972 by Karen Sparck-Jones.) Later in life, he became interested in automatic text summarization and analysis, as well as automatic hypertext generation. He published over 150 research articles and 5 books during his life.

== Honors and awards ==
Salton was editor-in-chief of the Communications of the ACM and the Journal of the ACM, and chaired Special Interest Group on Information Retrieval (SIGIR). He was an associate editor of the ACM Transactions on Information Systems. He was an ACM Fellow (elected 1995), received the Award of Merit from the American Society for Information Science (1989), and was the first recipient of the SIGIR Award for outstanding contributions to study of Information Retrieval (1983) -- now called the Gerard Salton Award.

== Bibliography ==
- Salton, Automatic Information Organization and Retrieval, 1968.
- Gerard Salton (1975). A Theory of Indexing. Society for Industrial and Applied Mathematics. p. 56. ISBN 978-0-89871-015-1.
- --- and Michael J. McGill, Introduction to modern Information Retrieval, 1983. ISBN 0-07-054484-0
- Gerard Salton (1989). Automatic Text Processing. Addison-Wesley Publishing Company. p. 530. ISBN 978-0-201-12227-5.
- Gerard Salton at DBLP Bibliography Server
- G. Salton, A. Wong, and C. S. Yang (1975), "A Vector Space Model for Automatic Indexing," Communications of the ACM, vol. 18, nr. 11, pages 613–620. (Article in which a vector space model was presented)
- G. Salton. (1980). 'Toward a dynamic library." In F. Wilfrid Lancaster, ed.The Role of the Library in an Electronic Society: Clinic on Library Applications of Data Processing. Urbana-Champaign: University of Illinois Graduate School of Library Science.

== See also ==
- List of pioneers in computer science
