= ECDL =

ECDL is an acronym which may refer to:

- El Canto del Loco, a Spanish pop group
- European Computer Driving Licence, a computer literacy certification
- European Conference on Digital Libraries, an international conference series
- External Cavity Diode Laser, a configuration of a stable diode laser.
