= Gerard Salton Award =

The Gerard Salton Award is presented by the Association for Computing Machinery (ACM) Special Interest Group on Information Retrieval (SIGIR) every three years to an individual who has made "significant, sustained and continuing contributions to research in information retrieval". SIGIR also co-sponsors (with SIGWEB) the Vannevar Bush Award, for the best paper at the Joint Conference on Digital Libraries.

== Awardees ==
Year	Name	Affiliation	Title
1983	Gerard Salton	Cornell University	About the future of automatic information retrieval.
1988	Karen Spärck Jones	University of Cambridge	A look back and a look forward.
1991	Cyril Cleverdon	Cranfield Institute of Technology	The significance of the Cranfield tests on index languages.
1994	William S. Cooper	University of California, Berkeley	The formalism of probability theory in IR: a foundation or an encumbrance?
1997	Tefko Saracevic	Rutgers University	Users lost (summary): reflections on the past, future, and limits of information science.
2000	Stephen E. Robertson	City University London	On theoretical argument in information retrieval.
2003	W. Bruce Croft	University of Massachusetts Amherst	Information retrieval and computer science: an evolving relationship.
2006	C. J. van Rijsbergen	University of Glasgow	Quantum haystacks.
2009	Susan Dumais	Microsoft Research	An Interdisciplinary Perspective on Information Retrieval.
2012	Norbert Fuhr	University of Duisburg-Essen	Information Retrieval as Engineering Science.
2015	Nicholas J. Belkin	Rutgers University	People, Interacting with Information
2018	Kalervo Järvelin	University of Tampere	Information Interaction in Context
2021	ChengXiang Zhai	University of Illinois Urbana–Champaign	Information Retrieval as Augmentation of Human Intelligence
2024	Ellen Voorhees	National Institute of Standards and Technology	What Gets Measured Gets Done: A Journey of Language Tasks Evaluation

== See also ==
- Information Retrieval Awards
- List of computer science awards
