= IRF =

IRF may refer to:

== General ==
- Impulse response function
- Inertial reference frame
- Information Retrieval Facility
- Initial Reaction Force or Internal Response Force
- Immediate Response Force
- Institute of Space Physics (Sweden), (Institutet för rymdfysik)
- Interferon regulatory factor (e.g. IRF6)
- International Rectifier, New York Stock Exchange symbol IRF

== Foundations/organizations ==
- International Ranger Federation
- International Rabbinic Fellowship
- International Rogaining Federation
- Islamic Research Foundation
- International Rafting Federation
- International Ringette Federation

== Computing ==
- Intelligent Resilient Framework, Virtual Switch Chassis Aggregation
