= Ingemar Cox =

Ingemar J. Cox
- Education: University College London; Oxford University
- Known for: Digital watermarking
- Awards: ACM Fellow; IEEE Fellow; IET Fellow; BCS Fellow
- Scientific career
- Fields: Computer science
- Workplaces: University College London University of Copenhagen

Ingemar J. Cox is Professor and Director of Research in the Department of Computer Science at University College London, where he is Head of the Future Media Group, and he is Professor in the Machine Learning department at the University of Copenhagen. Between 2003 and 2008, he was Director of UCL's Adastral Park Campus.

== Education ==
He has been a recipient of a Royal Society Wolfson Fellowship (2002–2007). He received his B.Sc. from University College London and Ph.D. from Oxford University.

== Career ==
He was a member of the technical staff from 1984 until 1989 at AT&T Bell Labs at Murray Hill, where his research interests were focused on mobile robots. In 1989 he joined NEC Research Institute in Princeton, New Jersey, as a senior research scientist in the computer science division. At NEC, his research shifted to problems in computer vision and he was responsible for creating the computer vision group at NECI. He has worked on problems to do with stereo and motion correspondence and multimedia issues of image database retrieval and watermarking. In 1999, he was awarded the IEEE Signal Processing Society Best Paper Award (Image and Multidimensional Signal Processing Area) for a paper he co-authored on watermarking. From 1997 to 1999, he served as Chief Technical Officer of Signafy, Inc., a subsidiary of NEC responsible for the commercialization of watermarking. Between 1996 and 1999, he led the design of NEC's watermarking proposal for DVD video disks and later collaborated with IBM in developing the technology behind the joint Galaxy proposal supported by Hitachi, IBM, NEC, Pioneer and Sony. In 1999, he returned to NEC Research Institute as a Research Fellow.

== Awards and honors ==
He is a Fellow of the IEEE, the IET, the British Computer Society, and the Association for Computing Machinery. He is a member of the UK Computing Research Committee. He was founding co-editor in chief of the IEE Proc. on Information Security. He is co-author of a book entitled Digital Watermarking and its second edition Digital Watermarking and Steganography, and the co-editor of two books, Autonomous Robots Vehicles and Partitioning Data Sets: With Applications to Psychology, Computer Vision and Target Tracking. In 2019, Cox received the Tony Kent Strix award. As of October 2020, he has a Google h-index of 78 and an i10-index of 191, and has had 44,433 citations made of his work. He has 49 patents and 299 publications.
