= Center for Intelligent Information Retrieval =

Center for Intelligent Information Retrieval (CIIR) is a research center at the Department of Computer Science, University of Massachusetts Amherst. It is a leading research center in the area of Information Retrieval and Information Extraction. CIIR is led by Distinguished Professor W. Bruce Croft and Professor James Allan.
