= TREC Genomics =

The TREC Genomics track was a workshop held under the auspices of NIST for the purpose of evaluating systems for information retrieval and related technologies in the genomics domain. The TREC Genomics track took place annually from 2003 to 2007, with some modifications to the task set every year; tasks included information retrieval, document classification, GeneRIF prediction, and question answering.

== See also ==
- TREC, the Text Retrieval Conference
