= W. Bruce Croft =

American computer scientist

W. Bruce Croft is a distinguished professor of computer science at the University of Massachusetts Amherst whose work focuses on information retrieval. He is the founder of the Center for Intelligent Information Retrieval and served as the editor-in-chief of ACM Transactions on Information Systems from 1995 to 2002. He was also a member of the National Research Council Computer Science and Telecommunications Board from 2000 to 2003. Since 2015, he is the Dean of the College of Information and Computer Sciences at the University of Massachusetts Amherst. He was Chair of the UMass Amherst Computer Science Department from 2001 to 2007.

Bruce Croft formed the Center for Intelligent Information Retrieval (CIIR) in 1991, since when he and his students have worked with more than 90 industry and government partners on research and technology projects and have produced more than 900 papers. Bruce Croft has made major contributions to most areas of information retrieval, including pioneering work in clustering, passage retrieval, sentence retrieval, and distributed search. One of the most important areas of work for Croft relates to ranking functions and retrieval models, where he has led the development of one of the major approaches to modeling search: language modelling. In later years, Croft also led the way in the development of feature-based ranking functions. Croft and his research group have also developed a series of search engines: InQuery, the Lemur toolkit, Indri, and Galago. These search engines are open source and offer unique capabilities that are not replicated in other research retrieval platforms source – consequently they are downloaded by hundreds of researchers world wide. As a consequence of his work, Croft is one of the most cited researchers in information retrieval.

== Education ==
Croft earned a bachelor's degree with honors in 1973 and a master's degree in computer science in 1974 from Monash University in Melbourne, Australia. He earned his Ph.D. in computer science from the University of Cambridge in 1979 and joined the University of Massachusetts, Amherst faculty later that year.

== Honors and awards ==
Croft has received several prestigious awards, including:

- ACM Fellow in 1997
- American Society for Information Science and Technology Research Award in 2000
- Gerard Salton Award (a lifetime achievement award) from ACM SIGIR in 2003
- Tony Kent Strix Award in 2013
- IEEE Computer Society Technical Achievement Award in 2014
- Best Student Paper Award from SIGIR in 1997 and 2005
- Test of Time Award from SIGIR for his papers published in 1990, 1995, 1996, 1998, 2001
- Many other publications are short-listed as the Best Paper Award in SIGIR and CIKM
