= Nicholas J. Belkin =

American computer scientist

- Born: 1942 (age 83–84)
- Known for: Anomalous State of Knowledge for Information Retrieval
- Awards: Gerard Salton Award (2015)
- Scientific career
- Fields: Computer Science
- Workplaces: Rutgers University

Nicholas J. Belkin is a professor at the School of Communication and Information at Rutgers University. Among the main themes of his research are digital libraries; information-seeking behaviors; and interaction between humans and information retrieval systems. Belkin is best known for his work on human-centered Information Retrieval and the hypothesis of Anomalous State of Knowledge (ASK). Belkin realized that in many cases, users of search systems are unable to precisely formulate what they need. They miss some vital knowledge to formulate their queries. In such cases it is more suitable to attempt to describe a user's anomalous state of knowledge than to ask the user to specify her/his need as a request to the system.

Belkin was the chair of SIGIR in 1995-99, and the president of American Society for Information Science and Technology in 2005. In 2015, Belkin received the Gerard Salton Award.

== Biography ==
Nicholas Belkin studied Slavic Philology at the University of Washington, graduating in 1968. He graduated from the same college in Library Science 2 years later (1970), and read his doctoral thesis in 1977 in the University of London. He worked in the Information Science department of this university from 1975 to 1985. That year, he signed for the Faculty of Communication and Information at Rutgers University (USA).

He has been a visiting professor at Western Ontario University(Canada), Dhirubhai Ambani Institute of Information and Communication Technology (India) and Free University of Berlin. He has been a visiting researcher at the National University of Singapore in 1996. He has given more than 200 lectures around the world.

He has been president of Association for Computing Machinery SIGIR (Special Interest Group on Information Retrieval) during the period 1995-1999, and president of the American Society of Information Science and Technology (ASIST) in 2005.

Nicholas Belkin has served on numerous editorial boards of numerous scientific journals. Among the most prestigious are "Information Processing and Management" and "Information Retrieval".

== Works ==
Nicholas Belkin has approached information retrieval from the so-called cognitive models , that is, those focused on users who access document systems. Belkin approached his research from 3 basic lines:

- Empirical studies on the behavior of the user who searches information.
- The creation of expert systems models.
- Design of interfaces friendly for the user.

In 1977, Belkin read his thesis where he developed a new theory of the concept documentary information . This would be a structure that would allow the user to transform his anomalous state of knowledge (Anomalous State of Knowledge or ASK), when the need for information is satisfied, producing an adequate connection between the two ends of the documentary process: the producer and the receiver or user.

For Belkin, the purpose towards which Documentation works is to make this effective communication possible, which would imply the study of documentary information in human and cognitive communication systems, the connection between this information and its producer, the connection between information and user, gives the idea of the requested information and the effectiveness between information and document and its transmission process.

Belkin concludes that the concept of documentary information is the combination of a cognitive communication system, a structural representation of knowledge, the implementation of the project via user when he recognizes the need for information (ASK9, the meaning of the text ( message) and the interest in solving the problem of information science. This theory has also been developed by Oddy and Brooks.

Nicholas Belkin proposed a novel cognitive model of information retrieval, referred to as 'episodic' . In this, Belkin defines a set of interactions that occur between the user and the system during the consultation to "conceptualize, label and transcribe the need for information, as well as make relevant judgments about one or more documents." The components would be the same as those used in the traditional model: navigation (browsing), query (querying), display, indexing, representation and matching.

This model pays very little attention to the structure of documents and their retrieval, because it focuses on the anomalous state of knowledge of the individual, how to represent it, how to retrieve it, so it is based on the storage, retrieval and interaction of the search strategy.

== Awards and published works ==
Nicholas Belkin has been awarded numerous times, obtaining in 2003 the Award of Merit, and the Gerard Salton Award in 2015.

Belkin has published numerous articles in the most prestigious magazines in the field of Information and Documentation, some awarded by the ASIST. He is also the author of the book: Interaction in Information Systems: A Review of Research from Document Retrieval to Knowledge-Based Systems (1985) co-authored with Alina Vickery.
