= C. J. van Rijsbergen =

Dutch computer scientist

Cornelis Joost van Rijsbergen
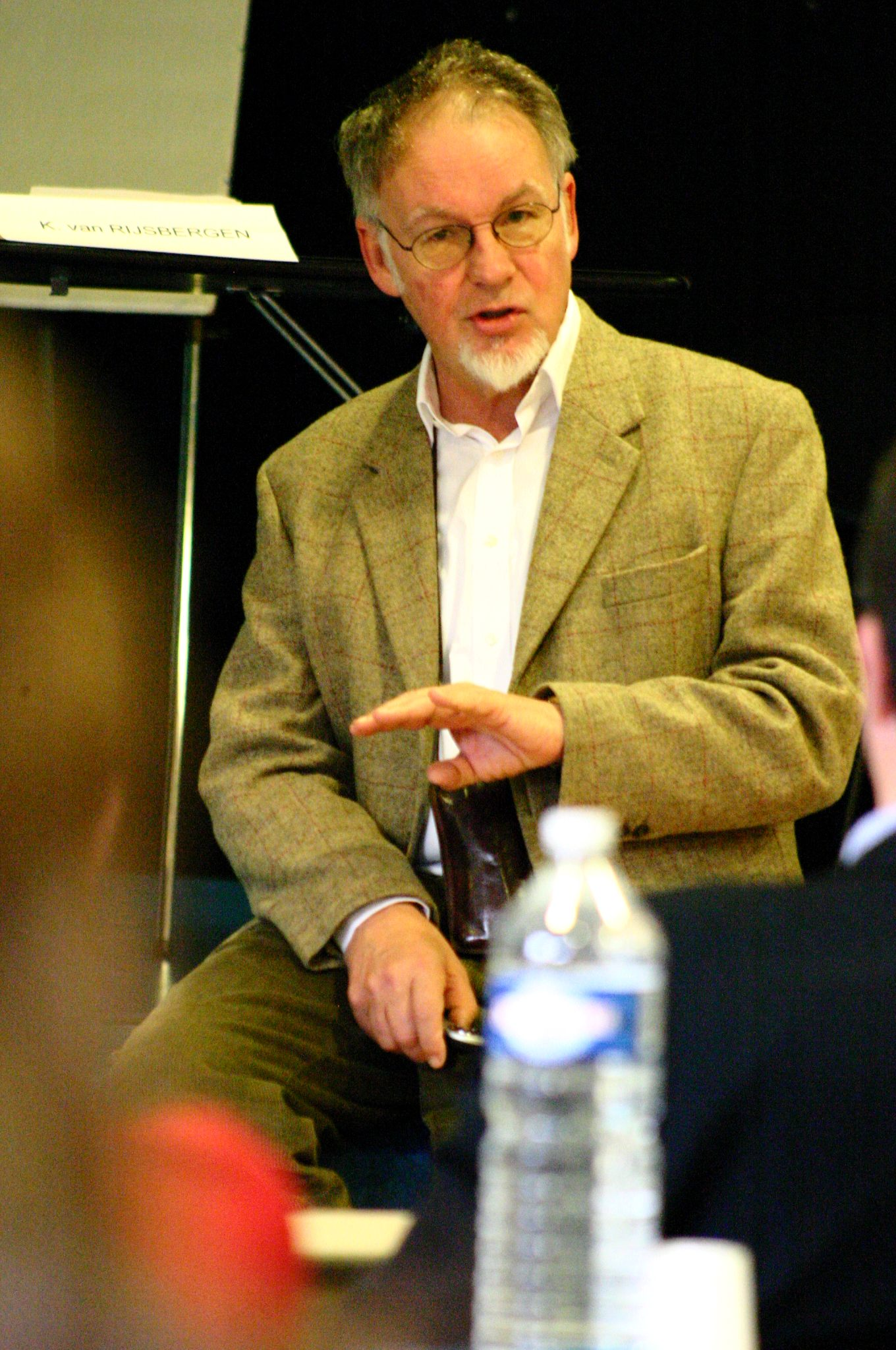
- C. J. "Keith" van Rijsbergen
- Born: 1943 (age 82–83); Rotterdam, Netherlands
- Education: University of Western Australia, University of Cambridge
- Scientific career
- Fields: Information Retrieval
- Workplaces: Monash University, University of Glasgow

C. J. "Keith" van Rijsbergen FREng (Cornelis Joost van Rijsbergen; born 1943) is a professor of computer science at the University of Glasgow, where he founded the Glasgow Information Retrieval Group. He is one of the founders of modern Information Retrieval and the author of the seminal monograph Information Retrieval and of the textbook The Geometry of Information Retrieval.

He was born in Rotterdam, and educated in the Netherlands, Indonesia, Namibia and Australia. His first degree is in mathematics from the University of Western Australia, and in 1972 he completed a PhD in computer science at the University of Cambridge. He spent three years lecturing in information retrieval and artificial intelligence at Monash University before returning to Cambridge to hold a Royal Society Information Research Fellowship. In 1980 he was appointed to the chair of computer science at University College Dublin; from there he moved in 1986 to Glasgow University. He chaired the Scientific Board of the Information Retrieval Facility from 2007 to 2012.

== Awards and honors ==
In 2003 he was inducted as a Fellow of the Association for Computing Machinery. In 2004 he was awarded the Tony Kent Strix award. In 2004 he was appointed a Fellow of the Royal Academy of Engineering. In 2006, he was awarded the Gerard Salton Award for Quantum haystacks. In 2009, he was made an honorary professor at the University of Edinburgh.

== See also ==
- F1 score
