= Donna Harman =

American information retrieval researcher

Donna K. Harman is an American information retrieval researcher. She is a group leader in the Retrieval Group at the National Institute of Standards and Technology. Harman won the Tony Kent Strix award in 1999 for her management of the Text REtrieval Conference (TREC) workshop series. TREC doubled the ability of text retrieval technologies to identify relevant texts, and influenced the development of Web search engines.
