= Ellen Voorhees =

American computer scientist

Ellen Marie Voorhees (born March 13, 1958) is an American computer scientist known for her work in document retrieval, information retrieval, and natural language processing. She works in the retrieval group at the National Institute of Standards and Technology (NIST).

== Education and career ==
Voorhees was born in Bensalem Township, Pennsylvania, and was the 1976 valedictorian at Bensalem High School. She completed her undergraduate studies at Pennsylvania State University, graduating in 1979 with a bachelor's degree in computer science. She attended Cornell University, where she received her master's degree and then went on to complete her Ph.D. in 1985. Her dissertation, The Effectiveness and Efficiency of Agglomerative Hierarchic Clustering in Document Retrieval, was supervised by Gerard Salton.

Prior to joining NIST, she was a senior member of the technical staff at Siemens Corporate Research in Princeton, New Jersey.

== Recognition ==
Voorhees was elected as an ACM Fellow in 2018 for "contributions in evaluation of information retrieval, question answering, and other language technologies".

In 2023, Voorhees was awarded an honorary Doctor of Science degree from the University of Glasgow in recognition of her body of work in the evaluation of information retrieval, question answering, and other language technologies.

In 2024, Voorhees received the Gerard Salton Award, a lifetime achievement award given by ACM's Special Interest Group on Information Retrieval (SIGIR).
