= Diffeo, Inc. =

American knowledge discovery software company

- Type: Acquired by Salesforce.com
- Industry: Software
- Founded: 2012; 14 years ago
- Founders: John R. Frank, Daniel A. Roberts, Max Kleiman-Weiner, Jason Briggs, Emily Pavlini, Aaron Taylor
- Defunct: 30 June 2020
- Headquarters: Cambridge, Massachusetts, U.S.
- Key people: Andrew Gallant, Tom DuBois, Geof Milstein, Cogan Culver, Keith Gabryelski
- Products: collaborative machine intelligence
- Website: diffeo.com

Diffeo, Inc. (/dɪfˈiːoʊ/ dif-E-oh), is a software company that developed a collaborative intelligence text mining product for defense, intelligence and financial services customers.

The Diffeo product is a recommender engine that analyzes text in a user's working documents, such as draft emails and web pages, identifying named entities and proposing related entities.

Diffeo was founded in 2012 and was acquired by Salesforce in 2019. The company grew out of NIST's Text Retrieval Conference where the founding team organized the Knowledge Base Acceleration (KBA) evaluation to measure the effectiveness of recommender engines.

== History ==
=== Founding ===
The company was founded by three Hertz Fellows, Dan Roberts, Max Kleiman-Weiner, and John Frank, a co-founder of MetaCarta. The name Diffeo comes from a shortening of diffeomorphism, which two of the cofounders were learning about in a class about black holes by Andrew Strominger. Diffeo was one of the first residents in hack/reduce.

=== Funding ===
In 2016, the company raised a seed round of approximately two million dollars from investors including Basis Technology and Carahsoft. Also in 2016, Diffeo acquired Meta, a search engine company founded by Jason Briggs, Emily Pavlini, and Aaron Taylor through a business plan competition at Williams College.

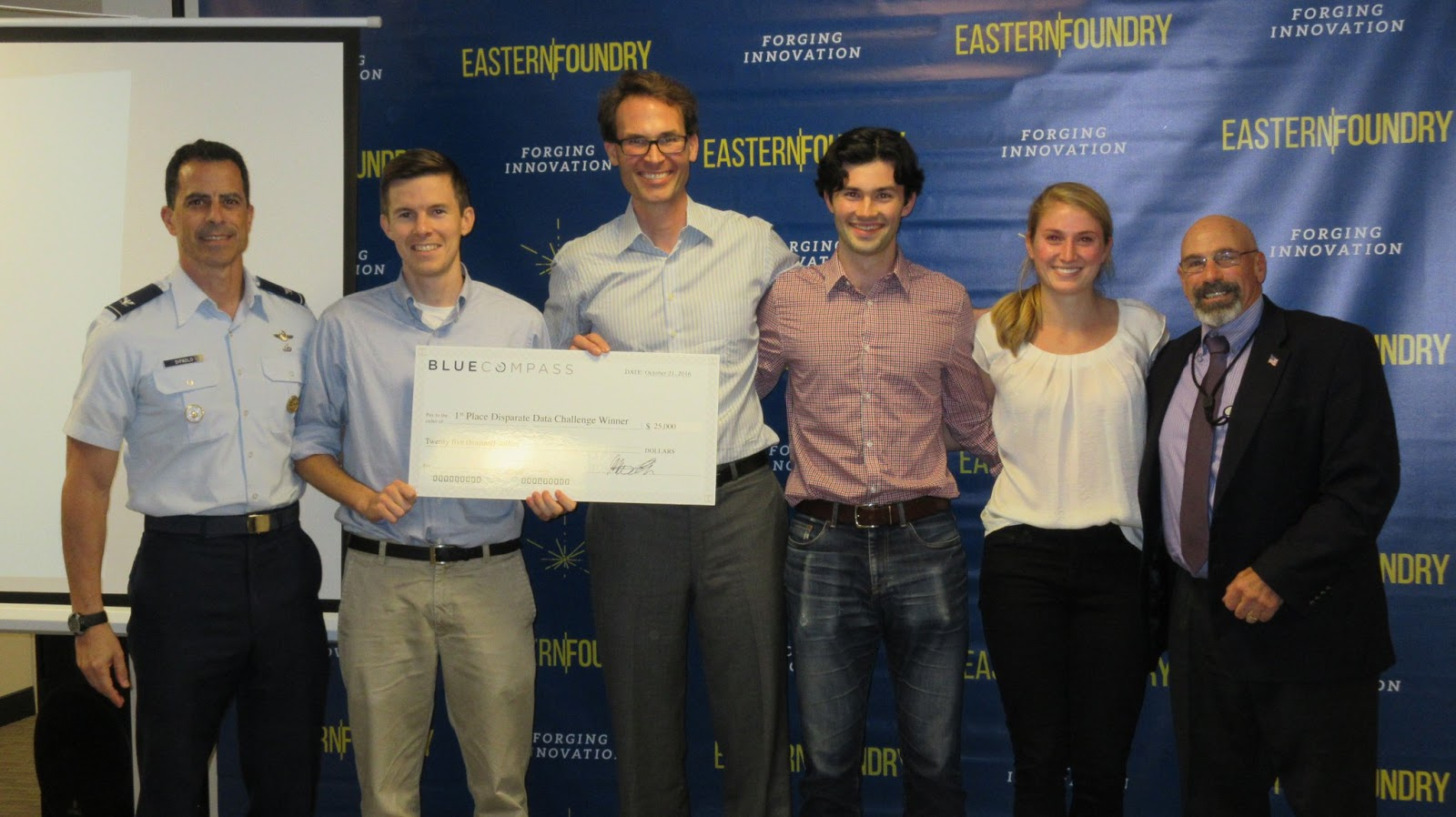
Diffeo team winning big check at NGA Disparate Data Challenge

=== Research ===
Diffeo's research focused on recommender engines and evaluation protocols for measuring the benefits of recommender engines for end users. As part of running the Knowledge Base Acceleration (KBA) track in NIST's Text Retrieval Conference from 2012 to 2014, the co-founders of Diffeo released a public dataset of timestamped news and blogs spanning approximately 12,000 hours. The KBA track aimed to measure approaches to accelerating the assimilation of knowledge into knowledge bases like Wikipedia.

The company's researchers published papers and open source code on machine learning techniques including Jacobian regularization, singular spectrum analysis, and hierarchical agglomerative clustering for entity disambiguation.

=== Post-Acquisition ===
In 2021, Salesforce announced an AI-powered assistant that helps B2B sales people with their deals. Briggs, who was previously CEO at Diffeo, is the Senior Director of Product Management, and helped in the creation of this AI assistant. This technology comes from Salesforce's acquisition of Diffeo, which also brought them Briggs.

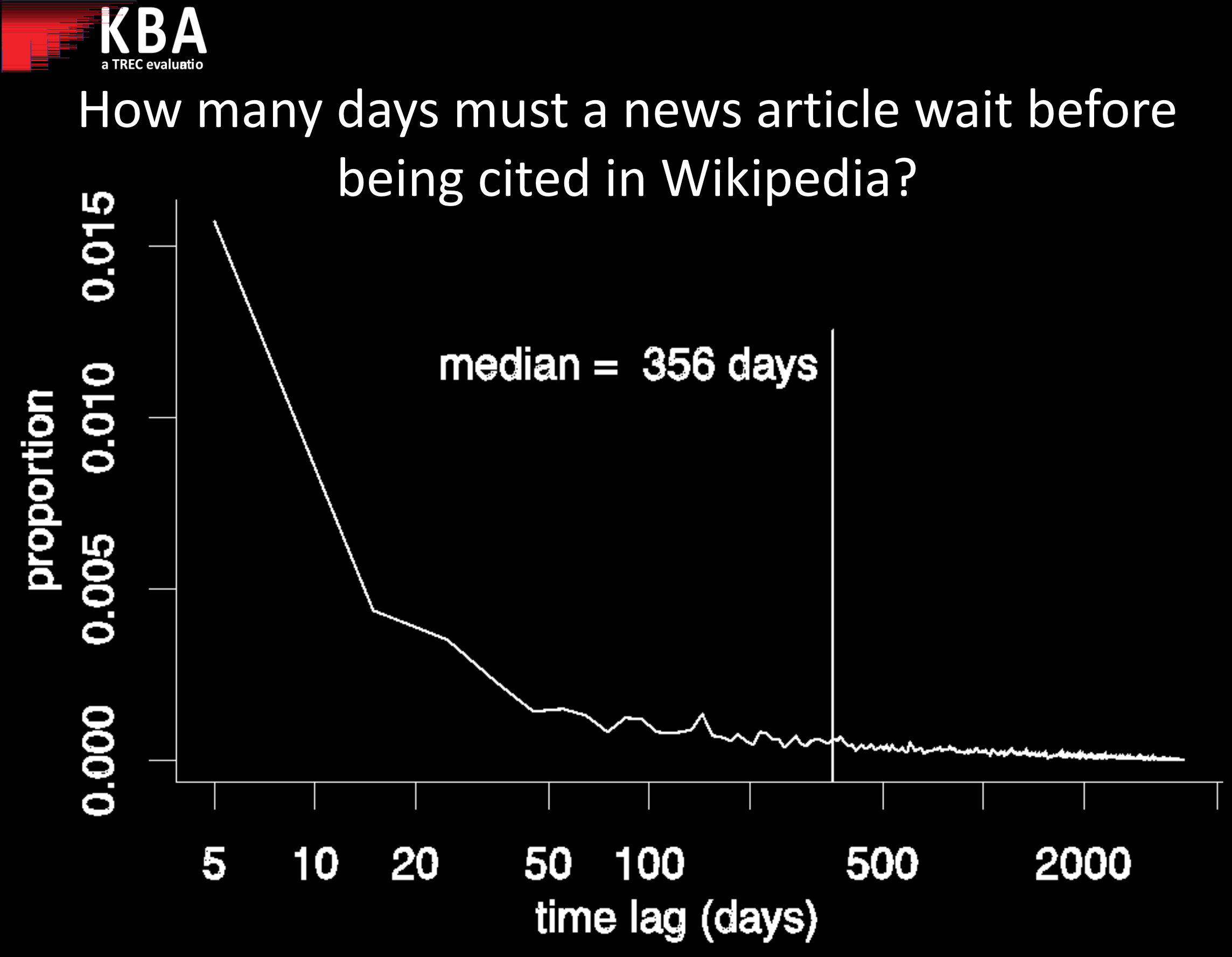
How many days must a news article wait before being cited in Wikipedia?

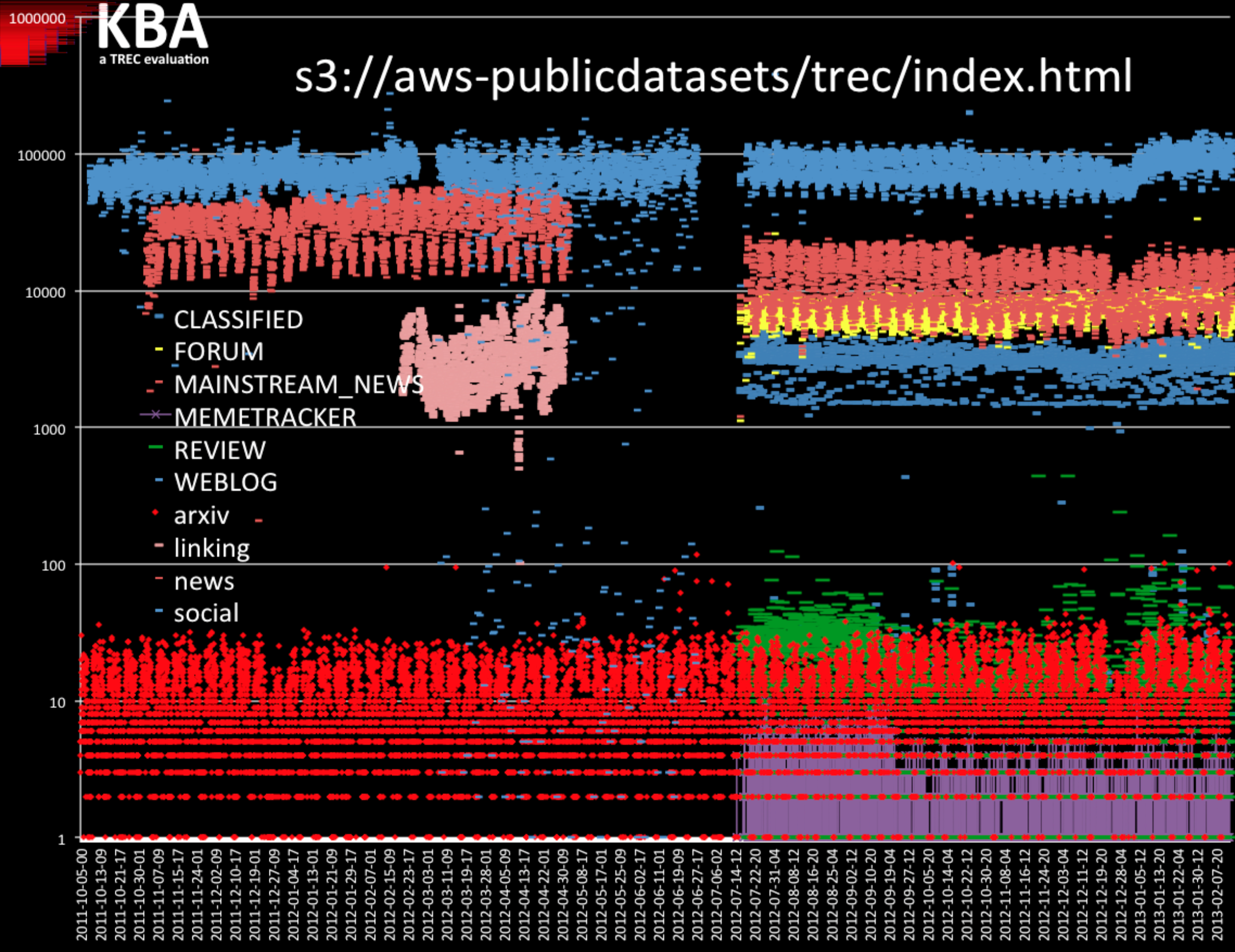
Time series histogram of article counts in the TREC KBA Streamcorpus at http://s3.amazonaws.com/aws-publicdatasets/trec/kba/index.html

== Product & technology ==
The Diffeo product, Diffeo Enterprise HierCoref (DEHC), is a recommender engine that allows users to "invite" an agent into their work documents in order to identify named entities and recommend related entities that it identifies by crawling the Web and the user's data repositories. For example, the product has plugins that enable it to analyze a user's emails and web pages open in their web browser.

The company's user meetings, called The AI<>Tradecraft Forum, brought together speakers from the information extraction industry and the US Intelligence Community, including NGA, United States Army, AFOSI, and NSA.

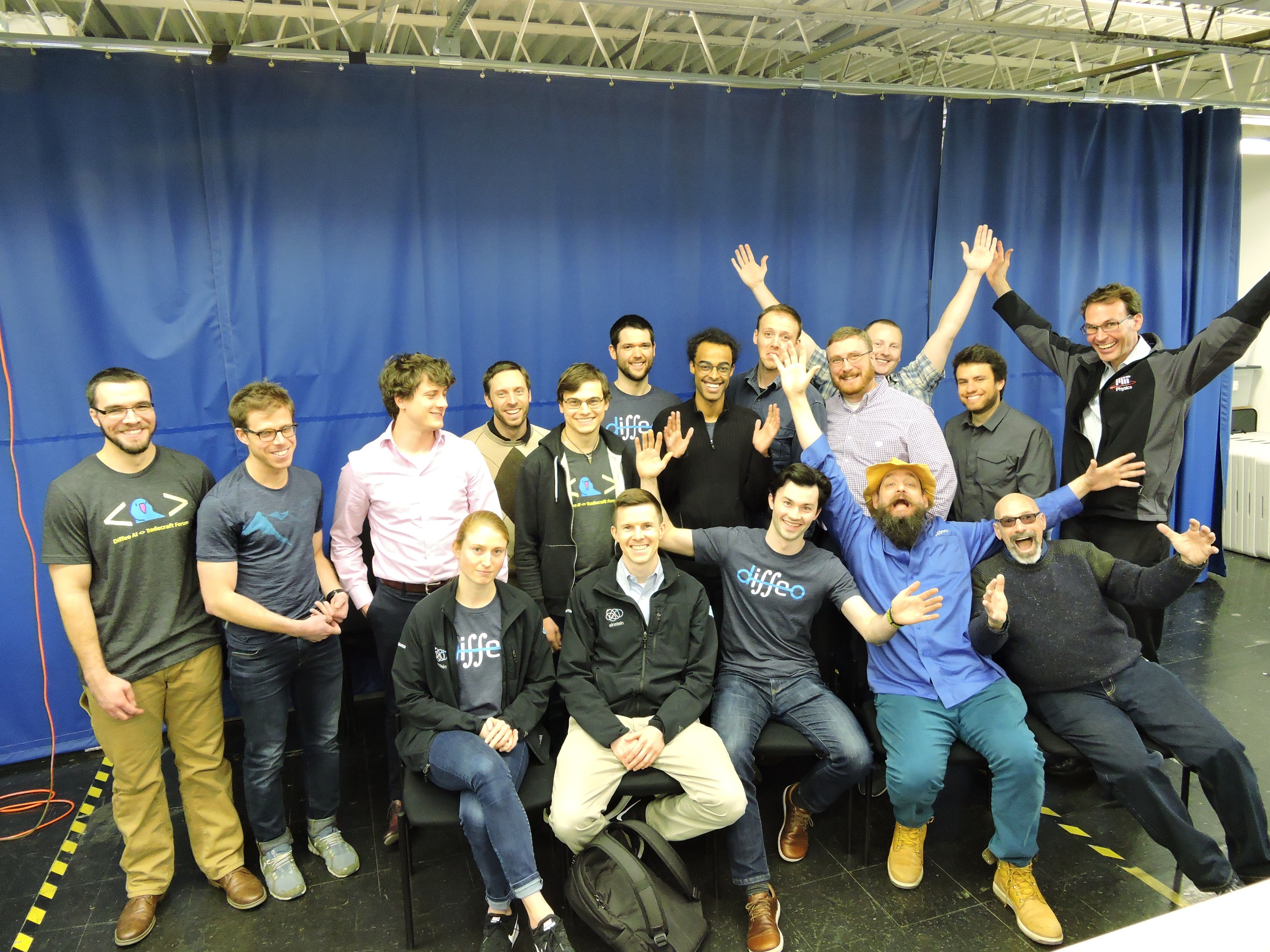
A Diffeo Company Meeting at Carahsoft in 2019

Figure 3 from US Patent 9,275,132

== Awards ==
Diffeo won the 2019 MassChallenge FinTech grand prize, was selected into the 2018 FinTech Innovation Lab and was one of 13 companies in the 2017 Salesforce AI Incubator. Diffeo won the Hertz Foundation's 2015 Newman Entrepreneurial Initiative.

The company was also a performer in DARPA's Memex program, and won the grand prize in the NGA Disparate Data Challenge.

== See also ==
- Collaborative intelligence
- Text Retrieval Conference
- Recommender engine
- Named-entity recognition
- Salesforce
