= Yoelle Maarek =

Israeli computer scientist

- יואל מארק
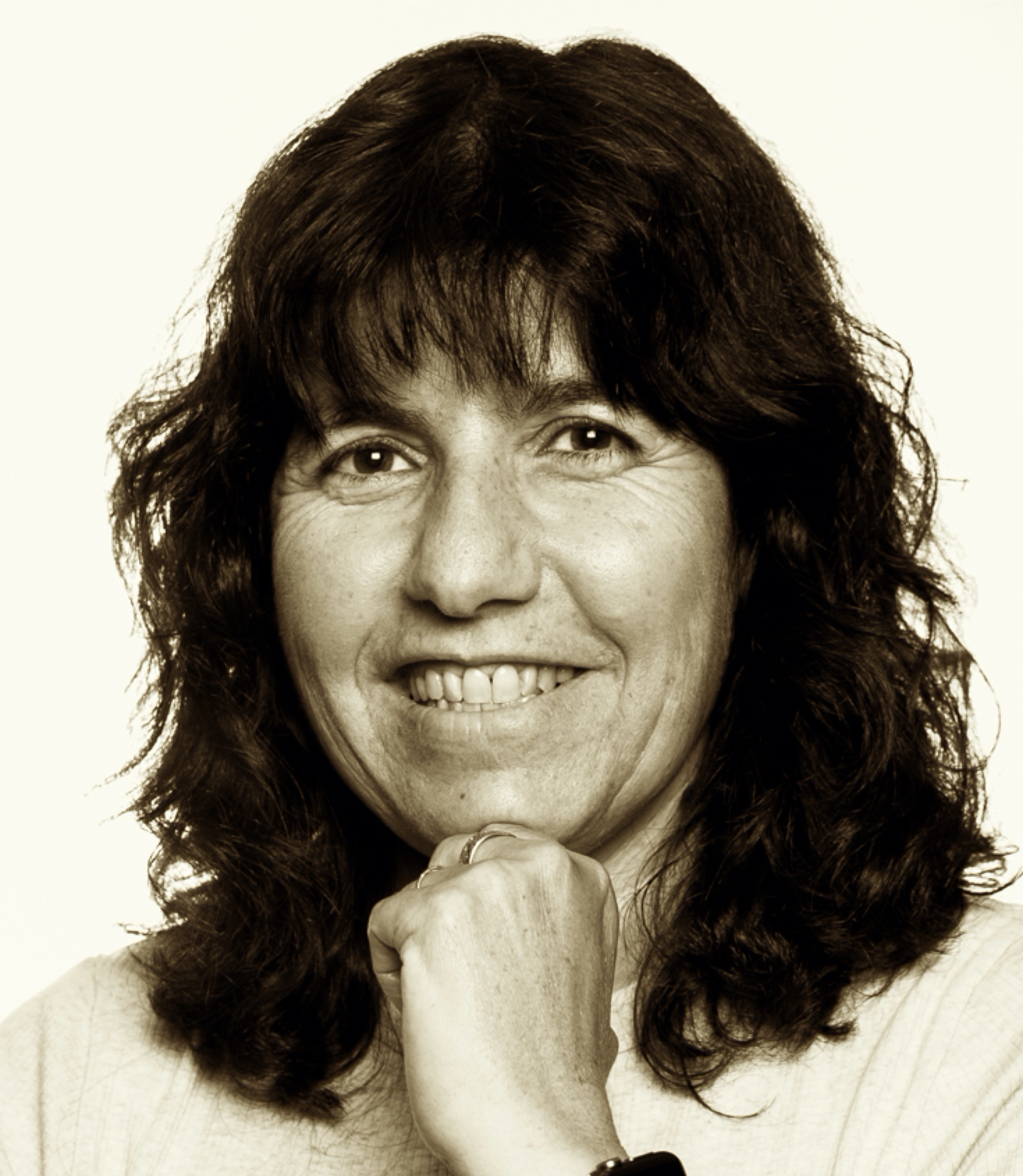
- Maarek in 2017
- Education: Technion – Israel Institute of Technology Pierre and Marie Curie University École Nationale des Ponts et Chaussées
- Known for: Information Retrieval
- Awards: ACM Fellow (2013), US National Academy of Engineering (2021)
- Scientific career
- Fields: Computer Science
- Workplaces: Amazon, Yahoo, Google, IBM
- Website: yoelle.com

Yoelle Maarek (Hebrew: יואל מארק) is a Franco-Israeli computer scientist. She is the Chief Researcher of AI/IR for the Technology Innovation Institute. Maarek is a researcher in the field of AI and information retrieval. She is a former Vice President of Science and Research at Amazon, responsible for Amazon's Alexa Shopping Research and a former Vice President of Research, at Yahoo! Labs, where she led several labs and the area of Mail Search among others. Maarek was a Director of Engineering at Google and the first engineering hire of Google Israel, where she established the company's development center in Haifa in 2006. At Google, her team launched in 2008 Google Suggest (now Google query autocomplete) worldwide on Google homepage as well as in Youtube soon after. She is a fellow of the Association for Computing Machinery, a member of US National Academy of Engineering and of the SIGIR Academy.

== Biography ==
=== Early years ===
Maarek grew up in Meudon-La-Foret France. She did her undergraduate studies at the École Nationale des Ponts et Chaussées in Paris, earned a diplôme d'études approfondies from Pierre and Marie Curie University. After completing her master's course, she began her doctoral studies at the Technion in the field of programming languages. During her doctoral studies, she spent a year as a visiting student at Columbia University in New York, where she was exposed to the field of search engines under the guidance of Prof. Gail Kaiser. After returning to Israel to complete her doctorate at the Technion – Israel Institute of Technology in 1989, she decided to change her field of research into search engines, under the supervision of Prof. Daniel M. Berry.

=== Career ===
After completing her doctorate, she returned to the United States and began working at IBM's Thomas J. Watson Research Center in New York State. As part of her role, she led the team that developed the company's first search engine, called "Guru". Maarek worked at IBM from 1989 until 2006, and became a distinguished engineer at IBM before moving to Google. In 2006, she founded the Google Haifa Engineering Center in Haifa, Israel, as Director of Engineering, where one of her key projects involved autocompletion for Google and YouTube queries. During 2009-2017 she worked in Yahoo research in Israel. From August 2017, she joined Amazon's Alexa Shopping Research and became the company's new Vice President of Worldwide Research.

Maarek has served as program committee co-chair for WWW 2009, WSDM 2012 and SIGIR 2012. She is also a member of the Board of Governors of the Technion. In 2013, Maarek was elected as a Fellow of the Association for Computing Machinery "for contributions to industrial leadership and to information retrieval and web search." Along with Marc Najork, Maarek was a co-chair of the SIGIR Academy 2025 Selection Committee.

=== Recognitions ===
- In 2009 and 2013, she was chosen as one of the 50 most influential women in Israel by the newspaper Globes.
- In 2013, she was elected as an ACM Fellow.
- In 2014, she was chosen by the Israeli newspaper Haaretz as one of the 66 Israeli women "worth getting to know".
- In 2014, she was ranked in #12 of the 22 most powerful women engineers in the world by Business Insider.
- In 2021, she was elected (as an inaugural member) to the ACM SIGIR Academy and to the US National Academy of Engineering
