= Susan Dumais =

American computer scientist (born 1953)

Susan T. Dumais
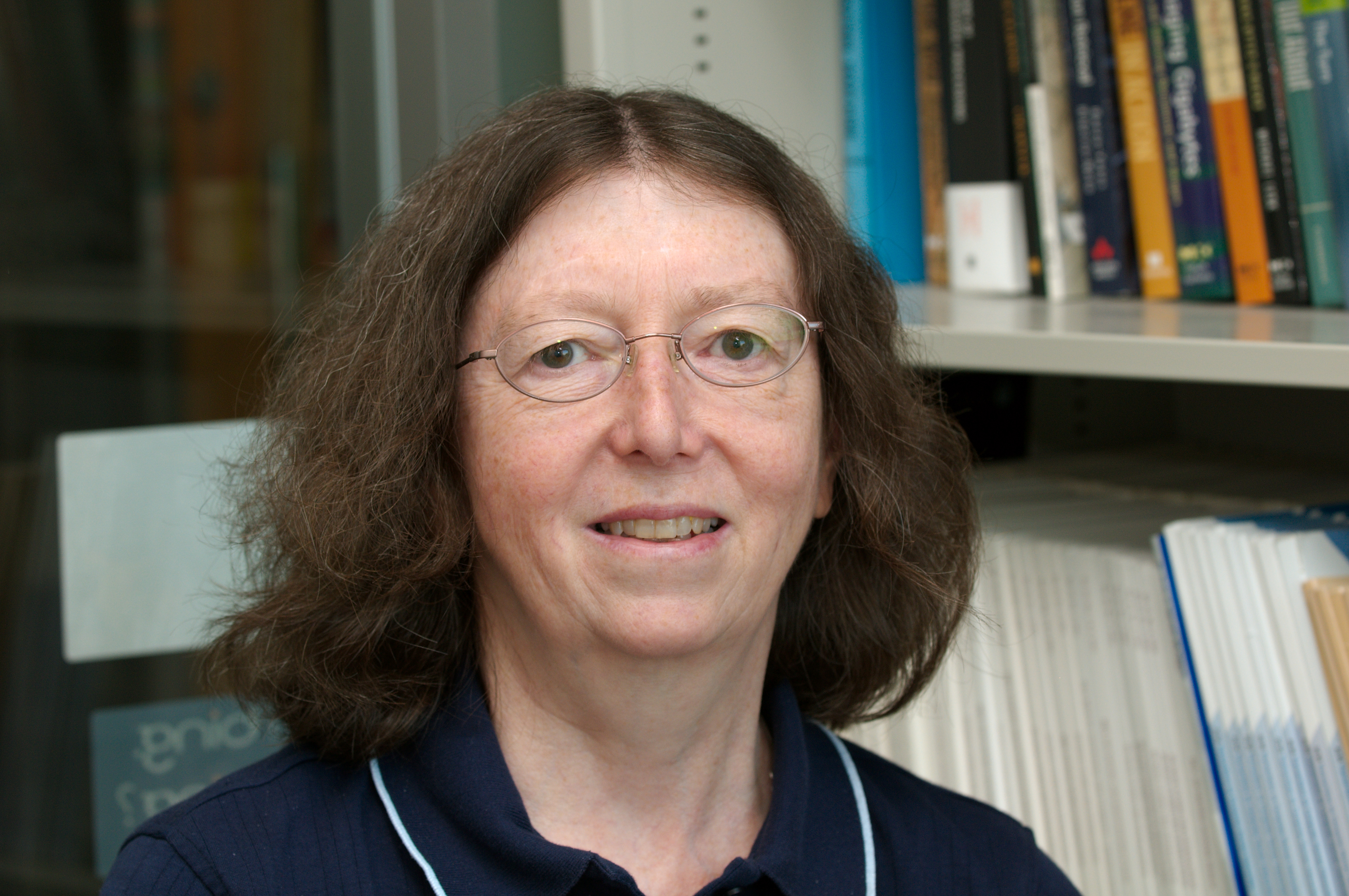
- Susan Dumais in 2009 in her office at Microsoft Research
- Born: Maine, US
- Education: Indiana University; Bates College
- Known for: Human Computer Interaction; Information Retrieval
- Awards: ACM-W Athena Lecturer Award (2014) SIGCHI Lifetime Achievement Award (2020) SIGIR Academy (2021)
- Scientific career
- Fields: Computer Science
- Workplaces: Microsoft Research
- Doctoral advisor: Richard Shiffrin
- Doctoral students: Jeff Huang
- Website: research.microsoft.com/~sdumais/

Susan T. Dumais (born August 11, 1953) is an American computer scientist who is a leader in the field of information retrieval, and has been a significant contributor to Microsoft's search technologies. According to Mary Jane Irwin, who heads the Athena Lecture awards committee, "Her sustained contributions have shaped the thinking and direction of human-computer interaction and information retrieval." In 2025, she was elected to the American Philosophical Society.

== Biography ==
Susan Dumais is a Technical Fellow at Microsoft and Managing Director of the Microsoft Research Northeast Labs, inclusive of MSR New England, MSR New York and MSR Montreal. Her research at Microsoft has focused on gaze-enhanced interaction, the temporal dynamics of information systems, user modeling and personalization, novel interfaces for interactive retrieval, and search evaluation. She is also an Affiliate Professor at the University of Washington Information School, where she was the Ph.D. advisor for computer science professor Jeff Huang.

Before joining Microsoft in 1997, Dumais was a researcher at Bellcore (now Telcordia Technologies), where she and her colleagues conducted research into what is now called the vocabulary problem in information retrieval. Their study demonstrated, through a variety of experiments, that different people use different vocabulary to describe the same thing, and that even choosing the "best" term to describe something is not enough for others to find it. One implication of this work is that because the author of a document may use different vocabulary than someone searching for the document, traditional information retrieval methods will have limited success.

Dumais and the other Bellcore researchers then began investigating ways to build search systems that avoided the vocabulary problem. The result was their invention of Latent Semantic Indexing.

== Awards ==
In 2006, Dumais was inducted as a Fellow of the Association for Computing Machinery. In 2009, she received the Gerard Salton Award, an information retrieval lifetime achievement award. In 2011, she was inducted to the National Academy of Engineering for innovation and leadership in organizing, accessing, and interacting with information. In 2014, Dumais received the Athena Lecturer Award for "fundamental contributions to computer science." and the Tony Kent Strix award for "sustained contributions that are both innovative and practical" with "significant impact". In 2015, she was inducted into the American Academy of Arts and Sciences. In 2020 she received the SIGCHI Lifetime Research Award and inducted into the ACM SIGIR Academy in 2021.
