= Ghigo Agosti =

Italian singer, musician and composer (1936–2024)

Ghigo Agosti at Manzoni Theatre (Milan 1969)

Ghigo Agosti (born Arrigo Riccardo Agosti; 10 July 1936 – 27 May 2024) was an Italian singer, musician, and composer. Agosti died on 27 May 2024, at the age of 87.

== Discography ==
=== 78rpm ===
==== Ghigo and orchestra ====
- 1954 Georgia on My Mind autoproduction-Decca (radio edition US-UK)

=== 45 rpm ===
==== Ghigo e gli arrabbiati ====
- 1958 Coccinella/Stazione del rock (limited edition Coca-Cola US – CCPR 01)
- 1959 Coccinella/Stazione del Rock (Primary CRA 91782 US-UK-Italy-France-Spain)
- 1960 Allocco tra gli angeli/Banana (frutto di moda) (Primary CRA 91797)

==== Ghigo ====
- 1961 Si titubi, Tu titubi / Tredici vermi col filtro (Primary CRA 91812)
- 1961 Banana (frutto di moda) /Coccinella/Stazione del rock/Allocco tra gli angeli (EP President AK308 France).
- 1961 Coccinella/Why wait (Coca-Cola – CCPR 02)
- 1961 No! Al demonio/Scalogna e carcere (lettera a giuseppe) – (Primary CRA 91797)
- 1962 Tredici vermi col filtro/Si titubi, Tu titubi/Allocco tra gli angeli/Banana (frutto di moda) – (EP Primary 5005).
- 1962 Babe twist me/Peppermint Twist – (Ri-Fi Italy-UK-France)
- 1963 Bella ragazzina di Verona/Solo con me/Dai fà la brava – (EP Primary CRA 91913)
- 1963 Georgia on my mind – (RiFi Italy-US-UK-France)

==== Ghigo e i Goghi ====
- 1964 Ciao/Conosco Jenny/Non avrei mai creduto – (EP Fantasy FS 1007)
- 1965 Sunny Afternoon/I'Got you -(inedit on 33 rpm 1995 Musicando Italy-Japan)
- 1966 Memphis Tennessee/Day dream – (inedit on 33 rpm 1995 Musicando Italy-Japan)
- 1967 In the midnight hour/Out side – (inedit on 33 rpm 1995 Musicando Italy-Japan)

==== Mister Anima ====
- 1966 Non voglio pietà/Solitude time – (Bluebell BB 3174)
- 1967 La mia passeggiata/L'attrazione – (Bluebell BB 3185)

==== Probus Harlem ====
- 1968 A whiter shade of pale/Hold on I'm coming – (Bluebell BB 3182 Italy-US-UK)
- 1968 Homburg/Love, drug and sex – (Bluebell BB 3191 Italy-US-UK)

==== Rico Agosti ====
- 1968 L'orsacchiotto nero/La Boutique – (Melody MD 603)
- 1968 The boutique/Small black bear – (Melody MD 603/A – US e UK)
- 1968 Ourson noire/La Boutique – (Melody MD 603/B – France)

==== Ghigo Agosti ====
- 1969 James Brown dice...io dico!!!/io dico!!! – (Belldisc BD 8027)

==== Black Sunday Flowers ====
- 1971 Madness/Hot rock – (Bla-Bla BBR 1308) (US-UK-Italy)

=== 33 rpm ===
- 1995 Coccinelle, Banane e altre storie (Musicando Italy-Japan)
- 1995 La Cosa (experimental) (Crotalo Italy-Japan)
- 1995 Ghigo e i Goghi (inedit 1965-67) (Musicando Italy-Japan)

=== CD ===
- 1993 Gli avanzi di Ghigo Peer Southern Music
- 1996 Frammenti di preghiera Musicando
- 1998 Ghigo Coccinella Dv More Record
- 2001 Preghiere semplici Hap (Spain)
- 2003 Risveglio in preghiera Hap
- 2006 May Gaar Hap
- 2007 Pallino blu Hap
- 2007 Space sarah Hap

=== Ghigo Story box CD ===
- 2007 Ghigo, gli Arrabbiati e i Goghi (anthology 1954-1964) Hap
- 2007 Goghi, Mister Anima, Rico & Black Sunday Flowers (anthology 1965-1971) Hap
- 2007 La Ghigonda ancestrale (anthology 1993-2007) Hap
- 2007 Super Live (live anthology 1994-2000) Cocodrilo Records
- 2007 L'esperimento (experimental anthology 1993-2007) Hap

=== Inedit song ===
- 1951 La stazione del blues
- 1955 Bocciato (agli esami di riparazione)
- 1956 Pallino blu
- 1957 La Gufa
- 1958 Jenny Jenny Jenny (jenny take a ride)
- 1959 I nanetti delle favole col cappuccio rosso fragola
- 1960 Carnevale celestiale
- 1972 Whole lotta love
- 1973 Cantina jam
- 1974 Il grillo e la formica

== Films ==
- 1961 Allocco tra gli Angeli – starring
- 1964 I tre volti – soundtrack arrangement
- 1964 Anthar l'invicibile – soundtrack arrangement
- 1971 Madness, vacanze per un massacro – motion pictures
- 1972 Il Caso Mattei – numerary, soundtrack arrangement
