= Peter Ingwersen =

Danish fashion designer (born 1962)

Peter Ingwersen III
- Born: October 10, 1962 (age 63); Copenhagen
- Occupation: Fashion designer

Peter Ingwersen (born 10 October 1962 in Copenhagen) is a Danish fashion designer.

== Life ==
Ingwersen grew up on his parents' farm outside of Kolding, then went to study at the Danish School of Design. Today he lives in the centre of Copenhagen.

== Career ==
His working life began with an internship at Levi's in Brussels (Belgium) as part of the third year of his studies, which was immediately followed with a job offer. He continued to work for them for almost 20 years, becoming director of Levi’s Europe, based in Brussels.

In 2001 he returned to his hometown and became managing director of the label DAY Birger et Mikkelsen.

In 2004, he founded the fashion label NOIR and the cotton fabric brand ILLUMINATI II. ILLUMINATI II produces organic cotton in Uganda following United Nations Global Compact principles and promotes the fabric to other brands. The NOIR collections are made from silk, wool, cotton, and fur with ethical certification.
