= Norbert Fuhr =

German computer scientist (born 1956)

Norbert Fuhr (born 1956) is a professor of computer science and the leader of the Duisburg Information Engineering Group based at the University of Duisburg-Essen, Germany.

== Education ==
His first degree is in technical computer science, which he got from the Department of Electrical Engineering and Information Technology of the Technical University of Darmstadt in 1980, and in 1986 he received his PhD (Dr.-Ing) from the Department of Computer Science of the same university on "Probabilistic Indexing and Retrieval".

== Profession ==
He held a PostDoc position in Darmstadt until 1991, when he was appointed associate professor in the Computer Science Department of the Technical University of Dortmund. Since 2002, he is a full professor at the University of Duisburg-Essen.

== Honors and awards ==
Fuhr's dissertation was awarded the "Gerhard Pietsch Award" of the German Society of Documentation in 1987. In 2012, he received the Gerard Salton Award.
