= Innovation Center for Artificial Intelligence =

The Innovation Center for Artificial Intelligence (ICAI) is a Dutch national network focused on joint technology development between academia, industry and government in the area of artificial intelligence (AI). The initiative was launched in April 2018 and is based at Amsterdam Science Park. As of 2024, the director of the ICAI is Maarten de Rijke. In November 2018, ICAI announced its contribution to AINED, the first iteration of the Dutch National AI Strategy.

== ROBUST program ==
In January 2023, Maastricht University announced the ROBUST program, led by the Innovation Center for Artificial Intelligence (ICAI) and supported by the University of Amsterdam and others. This initiative focuses on advancing research in trustworthy AI technology across various sectors, notably healthcare and energy, in the Netherlands. The program's plan includes the creation of 17 new labs and the appointment of PhD candidates, backed by a €25 million funding from the Dutch Research Council (NWO).

== Labs ==
The ICAI network is linked to several collaborative labs:

- Thira Lab (Imaging): Thirona, Delft Imaging Systems and Radboud UMC, founded March 2019
- AIMLab (AI for Medical Imaging): Uva and Inception Institute of Artificial Intelligence from the United Arab Emirates, founded March 2019
- AFL (AI for Fintech): ING and Delft University of Technology, founded March 2019
- Police Lab AI: Dutch National Police, founded January 2019
- Elsevier AI Lab: Uva and Elsevier, founded October 2018
- AIRLab Delft (AI for Retail Robotics): TU Delft Robotics and AholdDelhaize, founded November 2018
- Quva Lab (Deep Vision): Uva and Qualcomm, founded 2016 (prior to ICAI)
- AIRLab Amsterdam (AI for Retail): Uva and AholdDelhaize, founded April 2018
- DeltaLab (Deep Learning Technologies Amsterdam): Uva and Bosch, founded April 2017 (prior to ICAI)
- AI4SE (AI for Software Engineering Lab) Delft University of Technology and JetBrains, founded October 2023
- Atlas Lab: Uva and TomTom (TOM2)

== See also ==
- Center for AI Safety
