= Maristella Agosti =

Italian university professor (born 1950)

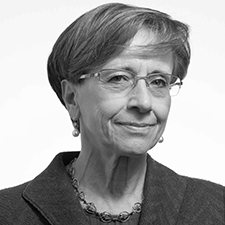
- Born: 1950
- Citizenship: Italian
- Awards: Tony Strix Award (2016)
- Scientific career
- Fields: Computer Science
- Workplaces: University of Padua
- Website: www.dei.unipd.it/~agosti/

Maristella Agosti (born 1950) is an Italian researcher and professor. Her research covers retrieval, user engagement, databases, digital cultural heritage, and data engineering. Agosti has published more than 200 papers covering these areas. She is also a professor of computer science at the University of Padua. She was granted the title of Professor Emeritus by Decree of the Italian Ministry of Education, University and Research. She is also a recipient of the Tony Kent Strix Award.

Agosti is the member of the Galilean Academy, Class of Mathematical, and Natural Sciences (Padua, Italy). Agosti established the Information Management System (IMS) research group.

== Education ==
Agosti obtained the "Laurea" degree in Statistics in 1975 (summa cum laude) with a research thesis on algorithms for automatic classification and worked as Online catalogue designer at the Historical Archive of Contemporary Arts (ASAC) of Biennale di Venezia until 1976.

== Career ==
Agosti is a researcher and professor, covering areas such as information retrieval, user engagement, databases, digital cultural heritage, and data engineering.

She worked as Online catalogue designer at the Historical Archive of Contemporary Arts (ASAC) of Biennale di Venezia until 1976. From 1980 to 1983, Agosti worked in the UK, firstly at the London School of Economics (1980) and then at the School of Mathematics Statistics and Computing of the Thames Polytechnic (1983) as a NATO-CNR research grant holder. From 1981 to 1987 she was assistant professor at the Faculty of Statistics of the University of Padua, from 1987 to 1999 she was associate professor at the Department of Electronics and Computer Science of the University of Padua and then full professor at the Department of Information Engineering of the same University until retirement in October 2020.

In 1990 she started the European Summer School in Information Retrieval (ESSIR).

With Costantino Thanos and other experts she started the Italian Research Conference on Digital Library Systems (IRCDL). She has been the Chair of the Steering Committee of the International Conference on Theory and Practice of Digital Libraries (TPDL); member of the Editorial Board of the International Journal on Digital Libraries; member of the Editorial Board of Information Processing and Management, the Computer Journal and the Information Retrieval Journal. With Nicola Ferro and Gianmaria Silvello, she has been responsible for the University of Padua of the technical design and development of the Archival Information System (SIAR) of the Veneto Region (Italy) from 2006 to 2015 (SIAR Veneto).

During her career, she has published more than 200 papers on the topics of information retrieval, data annotations, access to digital cultural heritage collections, hypertext information retrieval, user engagement, digital libraries, data engineering, digital archives (a partial list is available on DBLP). In 2016 she won the Tony Kent Strix award for her work in many aspects of information retrieval and digital libraries.

Currently, she is a member of the Galilean Academy, Class of Mathematical and Natural Sciences (Padua, Italy).

== IMS Group ==
Agosti started the Information Management System (IMS) research group in 1987.

== Recognition ==
On 15 July 2021 she was conferred the title of Professor Emeritus by Decree of the Italian Ministry of Education, University and Research.

Agosti is the first woman to be nominated Professor Emeritus in the School of Engineering of the University of Padua.

She was the recipient of Tony Kent Strix Award in 2016.
