= Information Retrieval Facility =

Organization in Vienna, Austria, 2006–2012

IRF logo

The Information Retrieval Facility (IRF), founded in 2006 and located in Vienna, Austria, was a research platform for networking and collaboration among professionals in the field of information retrieval. It ceased operations in 2012.

== Scientific goals ==
- Modeling innovative and specialized information retrieval systems for global patent document collections.
- Investigating and developing an adequate technical infrastructure that allows interactive experimentation with formal, mathematical retrieval concepts for very large-scale document collections.
- Studying the usability of multimodal user interfaces to very large-scale information retrieval systems.
- Integrating real users with actual information needs into the research process of modeling information retrieval systems to allow accurate performance evaluation.
- Ability to create different views of patent data depending on the focus of the information needed.
- Defining standardized methods for benchmarking the information retrieval process in patent document collections.
- Ability to handle text and non-text parts of a patent coherently.
- Designing, experimenting and evaluating search engines able to retrieve structured and semi-structured documents in very large-scale patent collections.
- Integrating the temporal dimension of patent documents in retrieval strategies.
- Improving effectiveness and precision of patent retrieval, based on ontologies and natural-language understanding techniques.
- Refining IR methods that allow unstructured querying by exploiting available structures within the patent documents.
- Formal (mathematical) identification and specification of relevant business information needs in the field of intellectual property information.
- Investigating efficient scaling mechanisms for information retrieval taking into account the characteristics of patent data.
- Investigating and experimenting with computing architectures for very high-capacity information management.
- Establishing an open eScience platform that enables a standardized and easy way of creating and performing IR experiments on a common research infrastructure.
- Discovering and investigating novel use cases and business applications deriving from intellectual property information.
- Enabling formal information retrieval, natural language and semantic processing research to grow into the field of applied sciences in the global, industrial context.
- Development and integration of different information access methods.
- Research on effective methods for interactive information retrieval.
