= Text Retrieval Conference =

Meetings for information retrieval research

Text REtrieval Conference
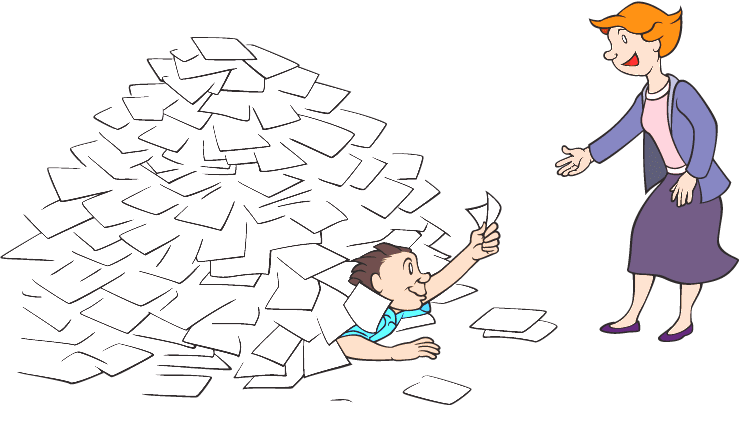
- ...to encourage research in information retrieval from large text collections.
- Abbreviation: TREC
- Discipline: information retrieval

Publication details
- Publisher: NIST
- History: 1992; 34 years ago
- Frequency: annual
- Website: trec.nist.gov

The Text REtrieval Conference (TREC) is an ongoing series of workshops focusing on a list of different information retrieval (IR) research areas, or tracks. It is co-sponsored by the National Institute of Standards and Technology (NIST) and the Intelligence Advanced Research Projects Activity (part of the office of the Director of National Intelligence), and began in 1992 as part of the TIPSTER Text program. Its purpose is to support and encourage research within the information retrieval community by providing the infrastructure necessary for large-scale evaluation of text retrieval methodologies and to increase the speed of lab-to-product transfer of technology.

TREC's evaluation protocols have improved many search technologies. A 2010 study estimated that "without TREC, U.S. Internet users would have spent up to 3.15 billion additional hours using web search engines between 1999 and 2009." Hal Varian the Chief Economist at Google wrote that "The TREC data revitalized research on information retrieval. Having a standard, widely available, and carefully constructed set of data laid the groundwork for further innovation in this field."

Each track has a challenge wherein NIST provides participating groups with data sets and test problems. Depending on track, test problems might be questions, topics, or target extractable features. Uniform scoring is performed so the systems can be fairly evaluated. After evaluation of the results, a workshop provides a place for participants to collect together thoughts and ideas and present current and future research work.Text Retrieval Conference started in 1992, funded by DARPA (US Defense Advanced Research Project) and run by NIST.

== Goals ==
- Encourage retrieval search based on large text collections
- Increase communication among industry, academia, and government by creating an open forum for the exchange of research ideas
- Speed the transfer of technology from research labs into commercial products by demonstrating substantial improvements retrieval methodologies on real world problems
- To increase the availability of appropriate evaluation techniques for use by industry and academia including development of new evaluation techniques more applicable to current systems

TREC is overseen by a program committee consisting of representatives from government, industry, and academia. For each TREC, NIST provide a set of documents and questions. Participants run their own retrieval system on the data and return to NIST a list of retrieved top-ranked documents. NIST pools the individual result judges the retrieved documents for correctness and evaluates the results. The TREC cycle ends with a workshop that is a forum for participants to share their experiences.

== Relevance judgments in TREC ==
TREC defines relevance as: "If you were writing a report on the subject of the topic and would use the information contained in the document in the report, then the document is relevant." Most TREC retrieval tasks use binary relevance: a document is either relevant or not relevant. Some TREC tasks use graded relevance, capturing multiple degrees of relevance. Most TREC collections are too large to perform complete relevance assessment; for these collections it is impossible to calculate the absolute recall for each query. To decide which documents to assess, TREC usually uses a method call pooling. In this method, the top-ranked n documents from each contributing run are aggregated, and the resulting document set is judged completely.

== Various TRECs ==
In 1992 TREC-1 was held at NIST. The first conference attracted 28 groups of researchers from academia and industry. It demonstrated a wide range of different approaches to the retrieval of text from large document collections .Finally TREC1 revealed the facts that automatic construction of queries from natural language query statements seems to work. Techniques based on natural language processing were no better no worse than those based on vector or probabilistic approach.

TREC2 Took place in August 1993. 31 group of researchers participated in this. Two types of retrieval were examined. Retrieval using an ‘ad hoc’ query and retrieval using a ‘routing' query

In TREC-3 a small group experiments worked with Spanish language collection and others dealt with interactive query formulation in multiple databases

TREC-4 they made even shorter to investigate the problems with very short user statements

TREC-5 includes both short and long versions of the topics with the goal of carrying out deeper investigation into which types of techniques work well on various lengths of topics

In TREC-6 Three new tracks speech, cross language, high precision information retrieval were introduced. The goal of cross language information retrieval is to facilitate research on system that are able to retrieve relevant document regardless of language of the source document

TREC-7 contained seven tracks out of which two were new Query track and very large corpus track. The goal of the query track was to create a large query collection

TREC-8 contain seven tracks out of which two –question answering and web tracks were new. The objective of QA query is to explore the possibilities of providing answers to specific natural language queries

TREC-9 Includes seven tracks

In TREC-10 Video tracks introduced Video tracks design to promote research in content based retrieval from digital video

In TREC-11 Novelty tracks introduced. The goal of novelty track is to investigate systems abilities to locate relevant and new information within the ranked set of documents returned by a traditional document retrieval system

TREC-12 held in 2003 added three new tracks; Genome track, robust retrieval track, HARD (Highly Accurate Retrieval from Documents)

== Tracks ==
=== Current tracks ===
New tracks are added as new research needs are identified, this list is current for TREC 2018.

- CENTRE Track – Goal: run in parallel CLEF 2018, NTCIR-14, TREC 2018 to develop and tune an IR reproducibility evaluation protocol (new track for 2018).
- Common Core Track – Goal: an ad hoc search task over news documents.
- Complex Answer Retrieval (CAR) – Goal: to develop systems capable of answering complex information needs by collating information from an entire corpus.
- Incident Streams Track – Goal: to research technologies to automatically process social media streams during emergency situations (new track for TREC 2018).
- The News Track – Goal: partnership with The Washington Post to develop test collections in news environment (new for 2018).
- Precision Medicine Track – Goal: a specialization of the Clinical Decision Support track to focus on linking oncology patient data to clinical trials.
- Real-Time Summarization Track (RTS) – Goal: to explore techniques for real-time update summaries from social media streams.

=== Past tracks ===
- Chemical Track – Goal: to develop and evaluate technology for large scale search in chemistry-related documents, including academic papers and patents, to better meet the needs of professional searchers, and specifically patent searchers and chemists.
- Clinical Decision Support Track – Goal: to investigate techniques for linking medical cases to information relevant for patient care
- Contextual Suggestion Track – Goal: to investigate search techniques for complex information needs that are highly dependent on context and user interests.
- Crowdsourcing Track – Goal: to provide a collaborative venue for exploring crowdsourcing methods both for evaluating search and for performing search tasks.
- Genomics Track – Goal: to study the retrieval of genomic data, not just gene sequences but also supporting documentation such as research papers, lab reports, etc. Last ran on TREC 2007.
- Dynamic Domain Track – Goal: to investigate domain-specific search algorithms that adapt to the dynamic information needs of professional users as they explore in complex domains.
- Enterprise Track – Goal: to study search over the data of an organization to complete some task. Last ran on TREC 2008.
- Entity Track – Goal: to perform entity-related search on Web data. These search tasks (such as finding entities and properties of entities) address common information needs that are not that well modeled as ad hoc document search.
- Cross-Language Track – Goal: to investigate the ability of retrieval systems to find documents topically regardless of source language. After 1999, this track spun off into CLEF.
- FedWeb Track – Goal: to select best resources to forward a query to, and merge the results so that most relevant are on the top.
- Federated Web Search Track – Goal: to investigate techniques for the selection and combination of search results from a large number of real on-line web search services.
- Filtering Track – Goal: to binarily decide retrieval of new incoming documents given a stable information need.
- HARD Track – Goal: to achieve High Accuracy Retrieval from Documents by leveraging additional information about the searcher and/or the search context.
- Interactive Track – Goal: to study user interaction with text retrieval systems.
- Knowledge Base Acceleration (KBA) Track – Goal: to develop techniques to dramatically improve the efficiency of (human) knowledge base curators by having the system suggest modifications/extensions to the KB based on its monitoring of the data streams, created the KBA streamcorpus, organized by Diffeo.
- Legal Track – Goal: to develop search technology that meets the needs of lawyers to engage in effective discovery in digital document collections.
- LiveQA Track – Goal: to generate answers to real questions originating from real users via a live question stream, in real time.
- Medical Records Track – Goal: to explore methods for searching unstructured information found in patient medical records.
- Microblog Track – Goal: to examine the nature of real-time information needs and their satisfaction in the context of microblogging environments such as Twitter.
- Natural language processing Track – Goal: to examine how specific tools developed by computational linguists might improve retrieval.
- Novelty Track – Goal: to investigate systems' abilities to locate new (i.e., non-redundant) information.
- OpenSearch Track – Goal: to explore an evaluation paradigm for IR that involves real users of operational search engines. For first year of the track the task was ad hoc Academic Search.
- Question Answering Track – Goal: to achieve more information retrieval than just document retrieval by answering factoid, list and definition-style questions.
- Real-Time Summarization Track – Goal: to explore techniques for constructing real-time update summaries from social media streams in response to users' information needs.
- Robust Retrieval Track – Goal: to focus on individual topic effectiveness.
- Relevance Feedback Track – Goal: to further deep evaluation of relevance feedback processes.
- Session Track – Goal: to develop methods for measuring multiple-query sessions where information needs drift or get more or less specific over the session.
- Spam Track – Goal: to provide a standard evaluation of current and proposed spam filtering approaches.
- Tasks Track – Goal: to test whether systems can induce the possible tasks users might be trying to accomplish given a query.
- Temporal Summarization Track – Goal: to develop systems that allow users to efficiently monitor the information associated with an event over time.
- Terabyte Track – Goal: to investigate whether/how the IR community can scale traditional IR test-collection-based evaluation to significantly large collections.
- Total Recall Track – Goal: to evaluate methods to achieve very high recall, including methods that include a human assessor in the loop.
- Video Track – Goal: to research in automatic segmentation, indexing, and content-based retrieval of digital video. In 2003, this track became its own independent evaluation named TRECVID
- Web Track – Goal: to explore information seeking behaviors common in general web search.

=== Related events ===
In 1997, a Japanese counterpart of TREC was launched (first workshop in 1999), called NTCIR (NII Test Collection for IR Systems), and in 2000, CLEF, a European counterpart, emphasizing cross-language information retrieval, was launched. The Forum for Information Retrieval Evaluation (FIRE) started in 2008 with the aim of building a South Asian counterpart for TREC, CLEF, and NTCIR.

== Conference contributions to search effectiveness ==
NIST claims that within the first six years of the workshops, the effectiveness of retrieval systems approximately doubled. The conference was also the first to hold large-scale evaluations of non-English documents, speech, video and retrieval across languages. Additionally, the challenges have inspired a large body of publications. Technology first developed in TREC is now included in many of the world's commercial search engines. An independent report by RTII found that "about one-third of the improvement in web search engines from 1999 to 2009 is attributable to TREC. Those enhancements likely saved up to 3 billion hours of time using web search engines. ... Additionally, the report showed that for every $1 that NIST and its partners invested in TREC, at least $3.35 to $5.07 in benefits were accrued to U.S. information retrieval researchers in both the private sector and academia."

While one study suggests that the state of the art for ad hoc search did not advance substantially in the decade preceding 2009, it is referring just to search for topically relevant documents in small news and web collections of a few gigabytes. There have been advances in other types of ad hoc search. For example, test collections were created for known-item web search which found improvements from the use of anchor text, title weighting and url length, which were not useful techniques on the older ad hoc test collections. In 2009, a new billion-page web collection was introduced, and spam filtering was found to be a useful technique for ad hoc web search, unlike in past test collections.

The test collections developed at TREC are useful not just for (potentially) helping researchers advance the state of the art, but also for allowing developers of new (commercial) retrieval products to evaluate their effectiveness on standard tests. In the past decade, TREC has created new tests for enterprise e-mail search, genomics search, spam filtering, e-Discovery, and other retrieval domains.

TREC systems often provide a baseline for further research. Examples include:

- Hal Varian, Chief Economist at Google, says Better data makes for better science. The history of information retrieval illustrates this principle well," and describes TREC's contribution.
- TREC's Legal track has influenced the e-Discovery community both in research and in evaluation of commercial vendors.
- The IBM researcher team building IBM Watson (a.k.a. DeepQA), which beat the world's best Jeopardy! players, used data and systems from TREC's QA Track as baseline performance measurements.

== Participation ==
The conference is made up of a varied, international group of researchers and developers. In 2003, there were 93 groups from both academia and industry from 22 countries participating.

== See also ==
- List of computer science awards
