= Maarten de Rijke =

Dutch computer scientist

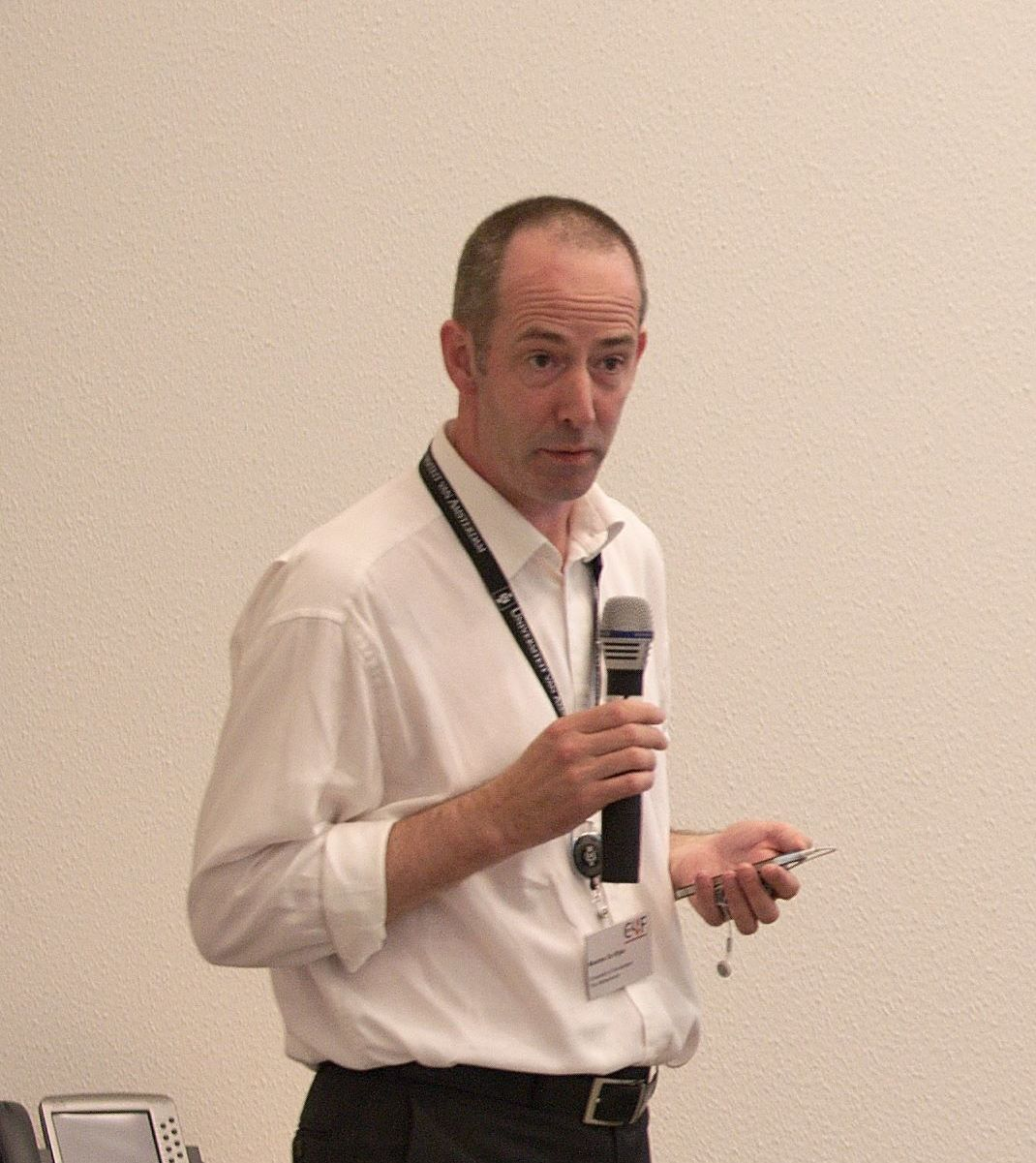
Maarten de Rijke, 2011

Maarten de Rijke (born 1 August 1961) is a Dutch computer scientist. His work initially focused on modal logic and knowledge representation, but since the early years of the 21st century he has worked mainly in information retrieval. His work is supported by grants from the Nederlandse Organisatie voor Wetenschappelijk Onderzoek (NWO), public-private partnerships, and the European Commission (under the Sixth and Seventh Framework programmes).

== Biography ==
Maarten de Rijke was born in Vlissingen. He studied philosophy (MSc 1989) and mathematics (MSc 1990) and wrote a PhD thesis, defended in 1993, on extended modal logics, under the supervision of Johan van Benthem.

De Rijke worked as a postdoc at the Centrum Wiskunde & Informatica, before becoming a Warwick Research Fellow at the University of Warwick. He joined the University of Amsterdam in 1998, and was appointed professor of Information Processing and Internet at the Informatics Institute of the University of Amsterdam in 2004 and is currently University Professor of Artificial Intelligence and Information Retrieval at the University of Amsterdam.

He leads the Information and Language Processing group at the University of Amsterdam, the Intelligent Systems Lab Amsterdam and the Center for Creation, Content and Technology.

He is the director of the newly established Innovation Center for Artificial Intelligence and a former director of Amsterdam Data Science.

== Recognition ==
De Rijke was elected a member of the Royal Netherlands Academy of Arts and Sciences in 2017. He was named as an ACM Fellow, in the 2024 class of fellows, "for contributions to information retrieval and leadership in public-private research collaborations in computer science".

He was awarded the Tony Kent Strix award in 2017.

== Work ==
During the first ten years of his scientific career Maarten de Rijke worked on formal and applied aspects of modal logic. At the start of the 21st century, De Rijke switched to information retrieval. He has since worked on XML retrieval, question answering, expert finding and social media analysis.

== Publications ==
Maarten de Rijke has published more than 700 papers and books.
