= European Conference on Digital Libraries =

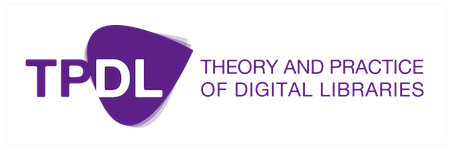

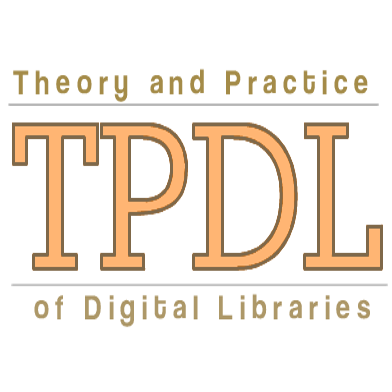

The International Conference on Theory and Practice of Digital Libraries (TPDL) started in 1997 as the European Conference on Research and Advanced Technology on Digital Libraries (ECDL).

== Overview ==
The first DELOS Working Group, partially funded by the European Union, laid the foundations for the establishment of a European Research Community on Digital Libraries. The conference has become a notable European forum focusing on digital libraries and associated technical, practical, and social issues. The conference invites papers on the wide range of topics of interest in this field, to the national and international community.

== Conferences ==
As the European Conference on Research and Advanced Technology for Digital Libraries (ECDL)

- ECDL 1997 – 1st edition held in Pisa (Italy) from 1 to 3 September Proceedings LNCS 1324
- ECDL 1998 – 2nd edition held in Heraklion (Greece) from 21 to 23 September Proceedings LNCS 1513
- ECDL 1999 – 3rd edition held in Paris (France) from 22 to 24 September Proceedings LNCS 1696
- ECDL 2000 – 4th edition held in Lisbon (Portugal) from 18 to 20 September Proceedings LNCS 1923
- ECDL 2001 – 5th edition held in Darmstadt (Germany) from 4 to 9 September Proceedings LNCS 2163
- ECDL 2002 – 6th edition held in Rome (Italy) from 16 to 18 September Proceedings LNCS 2458
- ECDL 2003 – 7th edition held in Trondheim (Norway) from 17 to 22 August Proceedings LNCS 2769
- ECDL 2004 – 8th edition held in Bath (UK) from 12 to 17 September Proceedings LNCS 3232
- ECDL 2005 – 9th edition held in Vienna (Austria) from 18 to 23 September Proceedings LNCS 3652
- ECDL 2006 – 10th edition held in Alicante (Spain) from 17 to 22 September Proceedings LNCS 4172
- ECDL 2007 – 11th edition held in Budapest (Hungary) from 14 to 19 September Proceedings LNCS 4675
- ECDL 2008 – 12th edition held in Aarhus (Denmark) from 14 to 19 September LNCS 5173
- ECDL 2009 – 13th edition held in Corfu (Greece) from 27 September to 2 October Proceedings LNCS 5714
- ECDL 2010 – 14th edition held in Glasgow (UK) from 6 to 10 September Proceedings LNCS 6273

In 2011 the conference was renamed to International Conference on Theory and Practice of Digital Libraries (TPDL).

- TPDL 2011 – 15th edition held in Berlin (Germany) from 25 to 29 September Proceedings LNCS 6966
- TPDL 2012 – 16th edition held in Paphos (Cyprus) from 23 to 29 September Proceedings LNCS 7489
- TPDL 2013 – 17th edition held in Valletta (Malta) from 22 to 26 September Proceedings LNCS 8092
- TPDL 2014 – 18th edition held London (UK) from 8 to 12 September. Jointly with JCDL. Proceedings
- TPDL 2015 – 19th edition held in Poznań (Poland) from 14 to 18 September Proceedings LNCS 9316
- TPDL 2016 – 20th edition held in Hannover (Germany) from 5 to 9 September Proceedings LNCS 9819
- TPDL 2017 – 21st edition held in Thessaloniki (Greece) from 18 to 21 September Proceedings LNCS 10450
- TPDL 2018 – 22nd edition held in – Porto (Portugal) from 10 to 13 September Proceedings LNCS 11057
- TPDL 2019 – 23rd edition held in – Oslo (Norway) from 9 to 12 September Proceedings LNCS 11799
- TPDL 2020 – 24th edition held in Lyon (France) from 25 to 27 August Proceedings LNCS 12246 (joint with ADBIS and EDA)
- TPDL 2021 – 25th edition hosted online by the Open University from 13 to 17 September Proceedings LNCS 12866
- TPDL 2022 – 26th edition to be held in – Padua (Italy) from 20 to 23 September
- TPDL 2023 – 27th edition
- TPDL 2024 – 28th edition
- TPDL 2025 – 29th edition to be held in – Tampere (Finland) from 23 to 26 September (joint with ADBIS)

== See also ==
- The European Library
- Joint Conference on Digital Libraries
