= ACM Transactions on Information Systems =

- Discipline: Computer science
- Language: English
- Edited by: Min Zhang

Publication details
- History: 1983–present
- Publisher: Association for Computing Machinery
- Frequency: Quarterly
- Impact factor: 4.797 (2020)

Standard abbreviations
- ISO 4: ACM Trans. Inf. Syst.

Indexing
- CODEN: ATISET
- ISSN: 1046-8188 (print); 1558-2868 (web)
- LCCN: 89646863
- OCLC no.: 40522749

Links
- Journal homepage; Online archive

ACM Transactions on Information Systems (ACM TOIS) is a quarterly peer-reviewed scientific journal covering research on computer systems and their underlying technology. It was established in 1983 and is published by the Association for Computing Machinery. The editor-in-chief is Min Zhang (Tsinghua University).

The journal is abstracted and indexed in the Science Citation Index Expanded and Current Contents/Engineering, Computing & Technology. According to the Journal Citation Reports, the journal has a 2020 impact factor of 4.797.
