= Joint Conference on Digital Libraries =

Annual conference

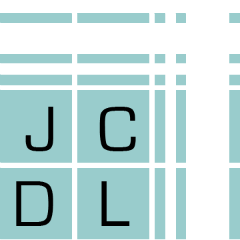
- Abbreviation: JCDL
- Discipline: Digital libraries

Publication details
- Publisher: Association for Computing Machinery, IEEE Computer Society
- History: 2000-present
- Frequency: Annual

The Joint Conference on Digital Libraries (JCDL) is an annual international forum focusing on digital libraries and associated technical, practical, and social issues. It is jointly sponsored by the Association for Computing Machinery and the IEEE Computer Society. It was formed in 2000 by combining the ACM Digital Libraries Conference (DL) and the IEEE CS Advances in Digital Libraries (ADL) Conference.

== Conferences ==
- JCDL 2018 - held in Wuhan (China) from August 1 to August 5
- JCDL 2019 - held in Urbana-Champaign (Illinois) (UIUC) from June 2 to June 6 Proceedings
- JCDL 2020 - held in Wuhan Hubei (China) from August 1 to August 5 Proceedings
- JCDL 2021 - hosted online by the University of Illinois School of Information Sciences Urbana-Champaign from September 27 to September 30
- JCDL 2022 - held in Cologne (Germany) and hosted online from June 20 to June 24
- JCDL 2023 - held in Santa Fe, New Mexico and online from June 26 to June 30
- JCDL 2024 - held in Hong Kong and online from December 16 to December 20
- JCDL 2025 - held virtually from December 15 to December 19
- JCDL 2026 - held in Dallas (Texas) and online from October 13 to October 16

== Awards ==
The conference awards the Vannevar Bush prize for best paper, best student paper, best international paper and best poster, presented to participants who have made outstanding contribution to this field. The conference invites papers on the wide range of topics of interest in this field, to the national and international community.
