= Adam Harvey (artist) =

American artist and computer vision researcher

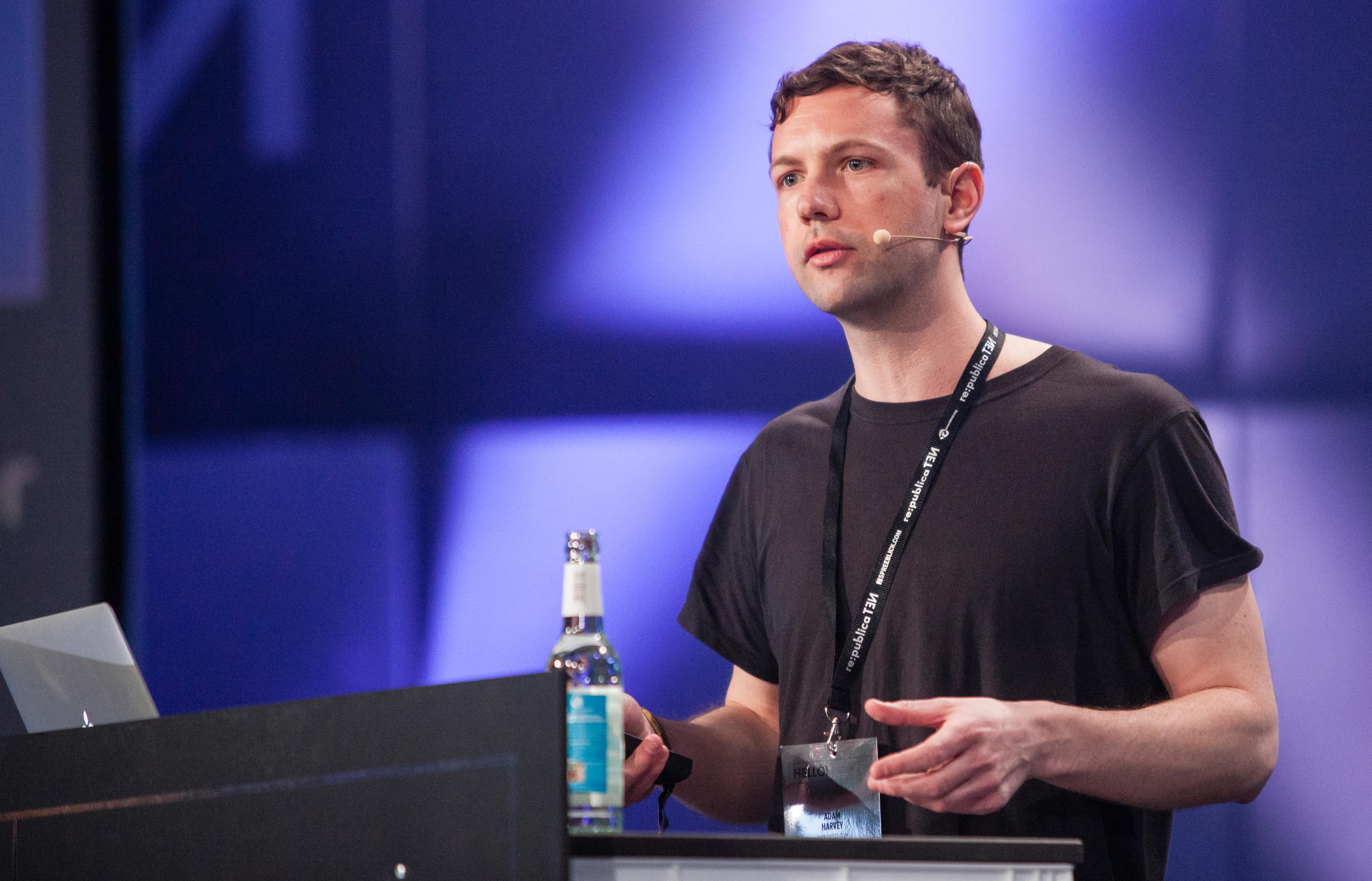
- Harvey speaking in Berlin, 2016
- Born: 1981 (age 44–45)
- Education: New York University (M.S) Pennsylvania State University (B.S)
- Occupation: Artist / Researcher
- Notable work: CV Dazzle Stealth Wear HyperFace
- Website: ahprojects.com

Adam Harvey is an American artist and researcher based in Berlin whose work focuses on computer vision, digital imaging technologies, and counter surveillance. His work includes projects combining art and technology as well as speaking and hosting talks on topics relating to data and computer vision.

== Education ==
Harvey attended Pennsylvania State University for his bachelor's degree and to study mechanical engineering. Whilst attending, Harvey worked at the school's newspaper, The Daily Collegian, as a photojournalist. He also had an interest in digital media and photography during his time. After working for four years, Harvey attended New York University for his master's degree in the school's Interactive Telecommunications Program where he studied computational photography and technology.

== Career ==
Harvey's projects and works focus mainly on the connection of photography and technology, and span multiple concepts such as facial recognition, surveillance, and art design. Currently, he is a designer and independent researcher based in Berlin. Harvey is a self-proclaimed creative technologist and focuses on incorporating art with the technological world with concepts such as anti-surveillance. He became interested in the impacts of technology through working as a photographer, with his first job being working as freelance photographer in New York City. Harvey is against the use of surveillance and believes that people need to be exposed to and understand the technology behind it. In an interview with ArtBlog, Harvey stated that he has staged activist events against surveillance and was always interested in protesting the state of surveillance.

A variety of technologies attempt to fool facial recognition software by the use of anti-facial recognition masks. He is the creator of the notable project/concept, CV Dazzle, aimed at camouflaging against facial detection systems, which turn images of faces into mathematical formulas that can be analyzed by algorithms. CV Dazzle – CV meaning computer vision – uses cubist-inspired designs to thwart the computer and fool the facial recognition software to minimize surveillance. This process uses multiple factors such as makeup, obscuring the eyes, and using objects to mask the facial structure of a person. Harvey's current work continues to explore variants of low-cost methods for averting high-tech surveillance. Think Privacy, is a worldwide advertising campaign asking individuals to consider what they are doing with their data. This included posters with phrases such as "Data Never Dies" and "Today's Selfie is Tomorrow's Biometric Profile".

Harvey is also an avid speaker and presenter, and has spoken at multiple conferences and meetings such as TED, notably at TEDxVilnius in Vilnius, Lithuania.

Harvey's work has been featured widely in media publication including the BBC, Spiegel, Washington Post, New York Times, Wired, The Atlantic, and the Financial Times; and shown at internationally acclaimed institutions, museums, and events.

Adam Harvey has also had multiple other endeavors such as teaching at New York University (his alma mater), working for NEW INC., an arts organization that produced the New Art Museum in New York, and other technological works.

Currently, Harvey is continuing to innovate with his current work investigating latent biometric information in low-resolution imagery, as well as anti-surveillance and facial recognition software and concepts. As of April 2020, Harvey is also working on his projects of VFrame, a computer vision software, and MegaPixels.

== Notable works/projects ==
- Adam Harvey's "CV Dazzle" - Focuses on dazzle camouflage and fashion to escape facial recognition software
- Stealth Wear - Fashion that addresses the rise of surveillance using Hoodies and Islamic Burqas
- SkyLift - a geolocation spoofing device
- MegaPixels - interrogating face recognition information supply chains
- Camoflash - An LED Anti-Paparazzi Device
- Think Privacy - Privacy Propaganda through posters and visualizations to highlight the uptick in surveillance in our world
- Off Pocket - A pants pocket to cut off all signal to one's cellular device
