= Anti-facial recognition mask =

Mask used to fool facial recognition software

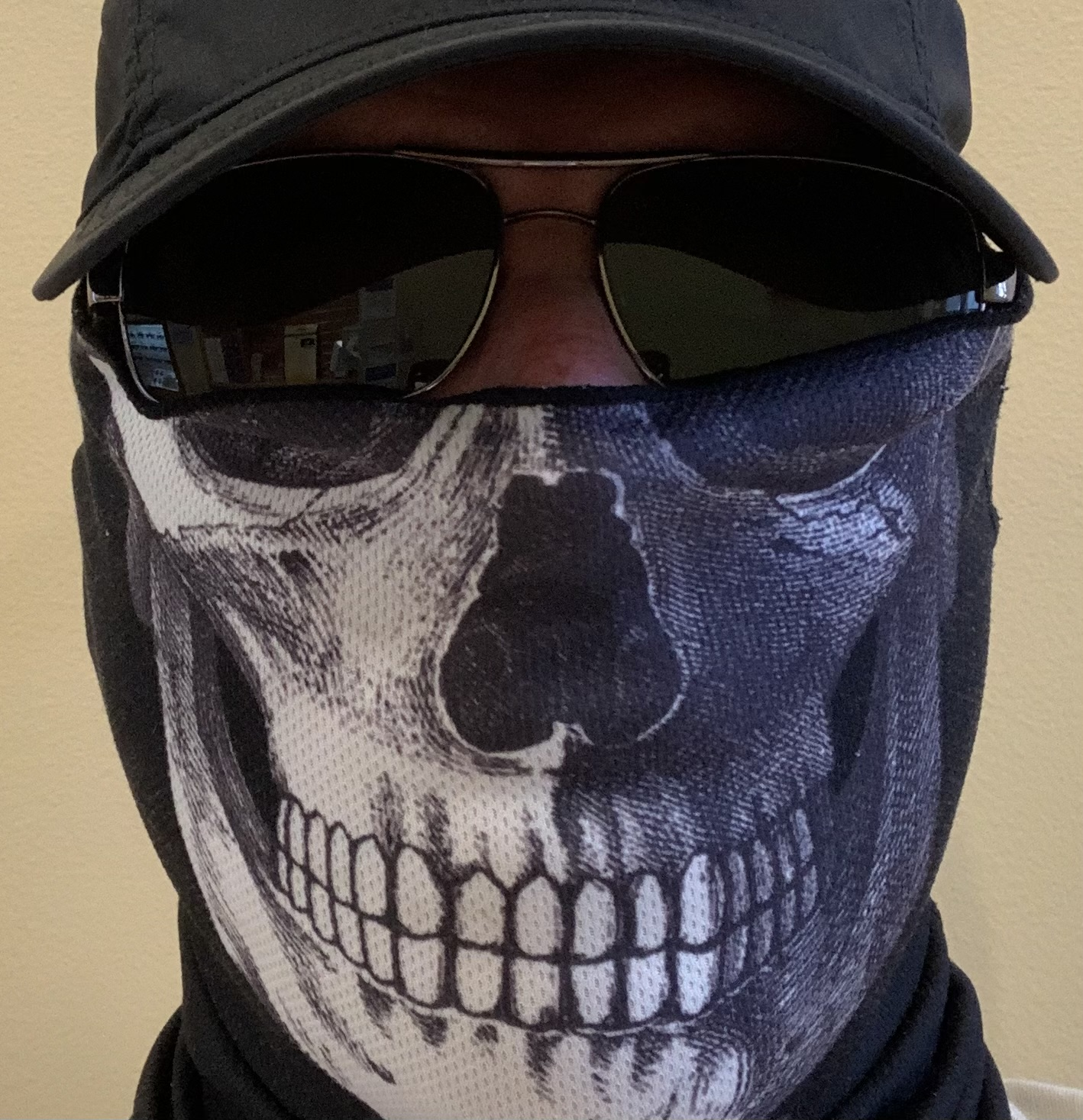
Person wearing a mask, glasses and a cap

An anti-facial recognition mask is a mask which can be worn to confuse facial recognition software. This type of mask is designed to thwart the surveillance of people by confusing the biometric data. There are many different types of masks which are used to trick facial recognition technology.

One low-technology method is to simply wear a mask over the mouth, along with sunglasses and a hat. Another type of anti-facial recognition mask involves the use of an asymmetrical face covering. Other designs make use of three dimensional faces to cover the wearer's face. Some types of masks used for this purpose are made of silicone. Some masks are high tech; for instance, scientists at Fudan University in China are trying to create a mask which projects dots onto the wearer's face to confuse the technology.

== Background ==
Many governments use facial recognition software to track and identify people using biometrics. Facial recognition software is complex and the technology utilizes CCTV to capture images. Many countries use a two-dimensional technology to identify people. The technology works by taking an image of a person's face and matching the image with databases. Usually the technology measures the distance between points of a person's face. Three-dimensional facial recognition using infrared also exists. Developers of facial recognition have realized that ears are just as unique as faces, so technology is being developed to identify people by their ears.

Many governments maintain databases of facial photos from government issued identification card photos, arrest photos and surveillance. China has employed a mass surveillance system. The United States and the United Kingdom have employed the technology to help police make arrests. Sydney and Delhi are two of the cities which are among the most surveilled. Companies also scrape images of faces from websites such as YouTube and Facebook, and sell the images to government agencies. In 2020 the company Clearview AI sold three billion photos that they scraped from websites to police and other law enforcement agencies.

In 2019, protestors in Hong Kong attempted to hide their faces from CCTV cameras utilizing masks. The use of high-tech surveillance in countries around the world to monitor protests and identify participants has led to the use of anti-facial recognition masks to thwart the surveillance. The use of the mask can protect those who engage in peaceful protests so that government facial recognition technology cannot track and intimidate the protestors.

== Design ==
Some mask designers have learned that a good design for an anti-facial recognition mask is to make the mask asymmetrical. One issue with using an asymmetrical mask is it can attract attention for the odd appearance. CNN said, "The resulting disguises look like amorphous, colorful blobs".

A mask can also be created with less technology, by using only a face mask and goggles.

People have also utilized "anti-facial-recognition face paint" to fool the technology. Makeup is being used to fool the software: this low-tech method utilizes asymmetric makeup in patterns on the face; the method is known as "anti-surveillance makeup".

Realistic custom-made silicone masks have been used to deceive convolutional neural network (CNN) based face-recognition (FR) systems.

One London artist named Zach Blas creates masks using data from many different faces and his company offers a "Facial Weaponization Suite". Another artist, Leo Selvaggio, proposed that a mask with a single person's face could be distributed and it would fool the software into thinking one person was in many different places all at once. Selvaggio began selling a three-dimensional mask of his own face and The Guardian newspaper stated that "This mask may make Selvaggio the most wanted—though ultimately wrongly accused—man on earth". He named his company "URME Surveillance" (You Are Me).

At Fudan University in China, scientists are working on a mask which would project dots onto a person's face using infrared light-emitting diodes (LEDs) that are affixed to the inside of the wearer's baseball cap.

German artist Adam Harvey proposed "Hyperface", which would fool the facial recognition software by printing many faces on a person's clothing to confuse the technology. His project is referred to as Computer Vision Dazzle.

A Polish designer, Ewa Nowak, created a face jewelry product called "Incognito". Three brass plates attach to the wearer's face and are connected by a wire. Nowak said that the product "[deflects] the software used to track you".
