= L-1 Identity Solutions =

American biometric technology corporation

L-1 Identity Solutions, Inc.
- Industry: Biometrics, Identity management, Homeland security
- Predecessor: Viisage Technology, Inc. and Identix Incorporated
- Founded: August 29, 2006
- Defunct: July 26, 2011
- Successor: Idemia
- Headquarters: Stamford, Connecticut, U.S.
- Key people: Robert V. LaPenta (Chairman, President and CEO)
- Number of employees: 2,200+ (as of 2010, prior to ISG divestiture)

L-1 Identity Solutions, Inc. was an American biometric technology company headquartered in Stamford, Connecticut, specializing in identity management products and services including facial recognition systems, fingerprint readers, and secure credentialing solutions for governments and commercial enterprises. The company's shares traded on the New York Stock Exchange under the ticker symbol "ID."

== History ==
L-1 Identity Solutions was formed on August 29, 2006, from a merger of Viisage Technology, Inc. and Identix Incorporated. Prior to the Safran acquisition, L-1 divested its Intelligence Services Group (ISG) comprising SpecTal LLC, Advanced Concepts Inc., and McClendon LLC to BAE Systems, Inc. for approximately $297 million. The transaction, initially announced in September 2010, closed on February 15, 2011, with more than 1,000 ISG employees joining BAE Systems' Intelligence & Security sector. It specializes in selling face recognition systems, electronic passports, such as Fly Clear, and other biometric technology to governments such as the United States and Saudi Arabia. It also licenses technology to other companies internationally, including China.

On July 26, 2011, Safran (NYSE Euronext Paris: SAF) acquired L-1 Identity Solutions, Inc. for a total cash amount of USD 1.09 billion. L-1 was part of Morpho's MorphoTrust department which rebranded to Idemia in 2017.

Bioscrypt is a biometrics research, development and manufacturing company purchased by L-1 Identity Solutions. It provides fingerprint IP readers for physical access control systems, Facial recognition system readers for contactless access control authentication and OEM fingerprint modules for embedded applications. According to IMS Research, Bioscrypt has been the world market leader in biometric access control for enterprises (since 2006) with a worldwide market share of over 13%. In 2011, Bioscrypt was sold to Safran Morpho.
