= Zach Blas =

British artist and writer

Zach Blas is an artist and writer based in London. Blas was a lecturer in visual cultures at Goldsmiths, University of London, and is now an associate professor of visual studies at the John H. Daniels Faculty of Architecture, Landscape and Design, University of Toronto.

== Education ==
Blas earned a Bachelor of Science in film studies and philosophy from Boston University and then a postbaccalaureate certificate from the School of the Art Institute of Chicago. Blas earned his Master of Fine Arts in media arts at the University of California, Los Angeles in 2008 and his PhD in literature at Duke University in 2014.

== Career ==
From 2014 to 2015, Blas was an assistant professor in the department of art at the University at Buffalo. His academic writing has appeared in publications including Camera Obscura and Women's Studies Quarterly.

His work engages with technology and politics and has been exhibited internationally at venues including the Institute of Modern Art, Brisbane; Museo Universitario Arte Contemporáneo, Mexico City; Whitechapel Gallery, London; and ZKM Center for Art and Media, Karlsruhe. In 2014, Hito Steyerl listed Blas as a "Future Great" in ArtReview.

=== Contra-Internet ===
In 2014, Blas published the essay "Contra-Internet Aesthetics" in You Are Here: Art After the Internet, edited by Omar Kholeif. Composed of videos, sculptures, and performative lectures, Contra-Internet explores alternatives to the corporate and state-controlled internet, particularly in light of internet censorship in the Arab Spring. Rhizome artistic director Michael Connor wrote that the project imagines "alternatives to the neoliberal internet we know today. The project isn't an argument for unplugging, exactly; more for building or dreaming up alternative infrastructures."

In 2016, Blas wrote a text for e-flux journal titled "Contra-Internet". Blas has lectured on the project at the Rhode Island School of Design Museum and Whitechapel Gallery. In 2016, he received a Creative Capital grant for the project.

=== Facial Weaponization Suite ===
Facial Weaponization Suite (2011–14) explores discriminatory practices latent in facial recognition systems. Composed of films and videos, the project emerged from community workshops Blas conducted where he scanned the faces of the participants and aggregated the data into an anti-facial recognition mask designed to resist recognition by biometric systems. The first entry in the project, Fag Face Mask was made in Los Angeles using the facial data of queer men's faces.

Curator Lauren Cornell wrote that "Blas’ project seems to fight directly against the way subversive politics or lifestyles become quickly co-opted and drained of power, often to be sold back to broader society in neutered form. His aim is to carve a space where a community and ideas can form without the pressure and dangers of visibility." The project has been exhibited internationally and written about in publications including Artforum, Frieze, Newsweek, The New York Times, the Walker Art Center magazine, and WNYC.

== Selected Exhibitions ==
=== Selected solo exhibitions ===
- 2024 CULTUS, Secession, Vienna, Austria.

=== Selected group exhibitions ===
- 2026 New Rituals [for the End of the World], Haus der elektronischen Künste, Basel, Switzerland.
- 2026 Whitney Biennial, Whitney Museum of American Art, New York, NY.
