= FRVT =

FRVT may refer to:

- Fore River Transportation Corporation
- Face Recognition Vendor Test
