= Interagency Training Center =

Coordinates: 38.736°N 77.010°W

The Interagency Training Center (ITC), also known as the Fort Washington Facility, is a National Security Agency (NSA) Central Security Service (CSS) school and training facility for technical surveillance counter-measures (TSCM) located in Fort Washington, Maryland. The U.S. government requires that all TSCM technicians be certified at the ITC. The facility previously housed the Department of Defense's Office of Special Technology, which managed technology development and acquisition programs such as the Technical Support Working Group. The site is administered by the U.S. Navy.
