= Randall C. Fowler =

American inventor

Randy Fowler
- Born: Randall Coleman Fowler; August 4, 1939 (age 87); Louisville, Kentucky
- Education: University of Louisville, Arizona State University, Stanford University
- Years active: 1982–2001
- Title: CEO of Identix, Inc.
- Website: www.randallcfowler.com

Randall Coleman Fowler (born August 4, 1939) is an American inventor, entrepreneur, and investor. In 1982 Fowler became the founder, chairman, President, and Chief Executive Officer of Identix, Inc. until his retirement in 2000.

Ten years prior to starting the company, Randy began investigating various techniques for reading fingerprints optically. He worked in the evenings in his garage whereby he created and patented the technology that transformed the biometrics Industry. His patents include electro-optical techniques for fingerprint and analysis forming, the basis for Identix.

Randy led Identix through its initial public offering in 1985 and subsequent financings including a number of acquisitions and mergers. In 1997, the San Jose Business Journal named him as Entrepreneur of the Year. Additionally, he has been the recipient of the Westergaard Kjakan Award of in 1998, and Professional Awards, and Distinguished Alumnus award, University of Louisville.

He holds a Doctorate of Science of Engineering from Stanford University, a Masters of Science in Engineering from Arizona State University, and a Bachelor of Science from University of Louisville.
