= Coke Zero Facial Profiler =

Former Facebook application

Facial Profiler was a free Facebook app created to promote Coca-Cola Zero by the advertising agency Crispin Porter + Bogusky. The app used face recognition technology to search a database of voluntarily participating Facebook users to match people based on appearance. The software's algorithm analyzed face attributes like skin color, face structure and angles of the face. Once matched, users could contact their look-alike via their Facebook profile.

Coke Zero claimed the inspiration for Facial Profiler came from the drink itself. The tagline for the project was: "If Coke Zero has Coke's taste, is it possible someone out there has your face?"

== Building the face database ==
Facial Profiler's initial phase, launched in September 2009, involved the creation of a "face database". Faces were gathered from photos that users personally uploaded and tagged to Facebook, stored photos uploaded from user hard drives and webcam photos taken via the app itself. Once the database gathered a statistically significant number of faces from both genders, various age groups and multiple ethnicities – the matching process began on December 3, 2009. Reportedly, more than 288,000 people installed the application by December 2009.

== Matches and voting ==
When a match was generated, a corresponding percentage of accuracy was assigned to the match. As more users submitted photos, the match accuracy was to increase. Users could vote on the accuracy of their match and other matches.

== Privacy concerns ==
The app adhered to Facebook privacy policies. It only searched photos of those who have voluntarily opted into the app. It removed user photos from their database if the user uninstalled the app.
