= Dynamic link matching =

Dynamic link matching is a graph-based system for image recognition. It uses wavelet transformations to encode incoming image data.
