= Countersurveillance =

Measures undertaken to prevent surveillance

Countersurveillance refers to measures that are usually undertaken by the public to prevent surveillance, including covert surveillance. Countersurveillance may include electronic methods such as technical surveillance counter-measures, which is the process of detecting surveillance devices. It can also include covert listening devices, visual surveillance devices, and countersurveillance software to thwart unwanted cybercrime, such as accessing computing and mobile devices for various nefarious reasons (e.g. theft of financial, personal or corporate data). More often than not, countersurveillance will employ a set of actions (countermeasures) that, when followed, reduce the risk of surveillance. Countersurveillance is different from sousveillance (inverse surveillance), as the latter does not necessarily aim to prevent or reduce surveillance.

== Types ==
=== Technical surveillance counter-measures ===
==== Electronic countermeasures ====
Most bugs emit some form of electromagnetic radiation, usually radio waves. The standard counter-measure for bugs is, therefore, to "sweep" for them with a receiver, looking for the radio emissions. Professional sweeping devices are very expensive. Low-tech sweeping devices are available through amateur electrical magazines, or they may be built from circuit designs on the Internet.

Sweeping is not foolproof. Advanced bugs can be remotely operated to switch on and off, and some may even rapidly switch frequencies according to a predetermined pattern in order to make location with sweepers more difficult. A bug that has run out of power may not show up during a sweep, which means that the sweeper will not be alerted to the surveillance. Also, some devices have no active parts, such as the Great Seal given to the US Ambassador to Moscow which hid a device (the Thing).

==== Software countermeasures ====
Amidst concerns over privacy, software countermeasures have emerged to prevent cyber-intrusion, which is the unauthorized act of spying, snooping, and stealing personally identifiable information or other proprietary assets (e.g. images) through cyberspace.

Popular interest in countersurveillance has been growing given media coverage of privacy violations:

- 2013 mass surveillance disclosures (Snowden/NSA PRISM).
- Cybercriminal who captured nude photos of Miss Teen USA 2013 by infiltrating through the webcam in her home.
- ABC News program baby monitor hacked in the bedroom of a Houston toddler.

==== Human countermeasures ====
Most surveillance, and most countersurveillance, involves human methods rather than electronic methods since people are generally more vulnerable and more capable of reacting creatively to surveillance situations.

Human countermeasures include:

- Evasion: avoiding risky locations, being discreet or circumspect, using code words
- Being situation-aware ("looking over your shoulder")
- Leaving the area without being seen or followed e.g. getting "lost in the crowd" so that followers lose contact
- Hiding in secure locations
- Concealing one's identity

Such activities make it harder to track surveillance subjects. Following steady, easy-to-predict schedules before employing aforementioned countermeasures may make the surveillance detail complacent and thus easier to lose.

==== Structural countermeasures ====
Another strategy is to utilize a room for safe conversations with these requirements:

- Strict access control with locks and burglar alarm
- Absence of windows or windows that cannot be reached by a laser microphone
- Electromagnetic shielding through the realization of a Faraday cage which covers doors, windows and walls
- No or little electronic equipment which must be sealed after being used
- Few cables that can be easily controlled
- Minimal furniture, preferably made of transparent materials
- Prohibition of introduction of electronic equipment
- Acoustic isolation
- Regular inspections

==== Network Counter‑Surveillance (NCSO) ====
In cybersecurity, defenders can deploy Network Counter‑Surveillance Operations (NCSOs) to monitor and gather intelligence on an attacker without immediately shutting down the compromised system. Rather than disconnecting the system outright (which alerts the adversary and may destroy valuable insights), defenders covertly observe the attacker’s tools, techniques, and objectives; potentially learning more about the intrusion and associated threat actors.

== Countersurveillance by countries ==
See List of counterintelligence organizations

=== United States ===
TSCM (technical surveillance counter-measures) is the original United States Federal government abbreviation denoting the process of bug-sweeping or electronic countersurveillance. It is related to ELINT, SIGINT and electronic countermeasures (ECM).

The United States Department of Defense defines a TSCM survey as a service provided by qualified personnel to detect the presence of technical surveillance devices and hazards and to identify technical security weaknesses that could aid in the conduct of a technical penetration of the surveyed facility. A TSCM survey will provide a professional evaluation of the facility's technical security posture and normally will consist of a thorough visual, electronic, and physical examination in and about the surveyed facility.

However, this definition lacks some of the technical scope involved. COMSEC (communications security), ITSEC (information technology security) and physical security are also a major part of the work in the modern environment. The advent of multimedia devices and remote control technologies allow huge scope for removal of massive amounts of data in very secure environments by the staff employed within, with or without their knowledge.

Technical Surveillance Countermeasures (TSCM) can best be defined as The systematic physical and electronic examination of a designated area by properly trained, qualified and equipped persons in an attempt to discover electronic eavesdropping devices, security hazards or security weaknesses.

==== Methodology ====
===== Radio frequencies =====
Most bugs transmit information, whether data, video, or voice, through the air by using radio waves. The standard counter-measure for bugs of this nature is to search for such an attack with a radio frequency (RF) receiver. Lab and even field-quality receivers are very expensive and a good, working knowledge of RF theory is needed to operate the equipment effectively. Counter-measures like burst transmission and spread spectrum make detection more difficult.

The timing of detection surveys and location scans is critical to success, and varies with the type of location being scanned. For permanent facilities, scans and surveys must take place during working hours to detect remotely switchable devices that are turned off during non-working hours to defeat detection.

===== Devices that do not emit radio waves =====
Instead of transmitting conversations, bugs may record them. Bugs that do not emit radio waves are very difficult to detect, though there are a number of options for detecting such bugs.

Very sensitive equipment could be used to look for magnetic fields, or for the characteristic electrical noise emitted by the computerized technology in digital tape recorders; however, if the place being monitored has many computers, photocopiers, or other pieces of electrical equipment installed, it may become very difficult. Items such as audio recorders can be very difficult to detect using electronic equipment. Most of these items will be discovered through a physical search.

Another method is using very sensitive thermal cameras to detect residual heat of a bug, or power supply, that may be concealed in a wall or ceiling. The device is found by locating a hot spot the device generates that can be detected by the thermal camera.

A method does exist to find hidden recorders, as these typically use a well known frequency for the clock which can never be totally shielded. A combination of existing techniques and resonance sweeps can often pick up even a defunct or "dead" bug in this way by measuring recent changes in the electromagnetic spectrum.

==== Technology used ====
Technology most commonly used for a bug sweep includes but is not limited to:

- Broadband receivers to detect radiating hostile radio frequency transmissions in the near field.
- Flashlight one of the most important tools to have beside a ladder for providing a competent sweep.
- Frequency scanner with a range of antennas and filters for checking the electromagnetic spectrum for signals that should not be there.
- GSM detection equipment
- WiFi and broadband detection equipment
- Lens detectors to detect the lenses of wired or wireless concealed covert cameras.
- Multimeters for general measurements of power supplies and device components.
- Nonlinear junction detector (NLJD) to detect components associated with hidden eavesdropping devices.
- Oscilloscope for visualisation of signals.
- Spectrum analyzer and vector signal analyzer for more advanced analysis of threatening and non threatening RF signals.
- Thermal imagers to help find hot spots and areas higher in temperature than the ambient area temperature. Finds heat generated from active electronic components.
- Time-domain reflectometer (TDR) for testing the integrity of copper telephone lines and other communication cables.
- Tools for manual disassembling of objects and walls in order to visually check their content. This is the most important, most laborious, least glamorous and hence most neglected part of a check.
- Videoscopes to inspect small or inaccessible spaces, such as wall spaces, HVAC components, vehicle crevices, etc.
- Portable x-ray machine for checking the inside of objects and walls.
- Electromagnetic pulse generators and directed energy uses high voltage and high current surges to temporarily disrupt or permanently disable electronic equipment.

Many companies create the hardware and software necessary to engage in modern countersurveillance including Kestrel TSCM, SignalHound, 3 dB Labs, Arcale, and many others.

Spectrum monitoring can help identify radio-frequency activity and sources of interference. The National Institute of Standards and Technology has examined spectrum-monitoring requirements for industrial environments, including environments with radio-frequency activity and noise.

=== Canada ===
In 2011, Defence Minister Peter MacKay authorized a program to search telephone and internet usage for suspicious activities. This program searches for and collects metadata of Canadians across the country.

==== Canadian Movements ====
There are minimal anti-surveillance movements specifically targeted to Canada at present.

Transparent Lives is a prominent Canadian organization that aims to "demonstrate dramatically just how visible we have all become to myriad organizations and what this means—for better or for worse—for how we conduct our everyday lives."

==== International movements currently active In Canada ====
Amnesty International runs a campaign called #UnfollowMe that "calls on governments to ban mass surveillance and unlawful intelligence sharing", inspired by Edward Snowden leaking thousands of NSA documents that revealed information about mass surveillance in the U.S. This campaign is active worldwide.

== See also ==
- Computer security
- Communications security
- Espionage
- Privacy
- Sousveillance
- Dead drop
- Cut-out (espionage)
- Cyber security and countermeasure
- Common Vulnerabilities and Exposures
- Privacy-enhancing technologies
- Personally identifiable information
- Countermeasure (computer)
- Covert listening device
- Encryption
- Interagency Training Center, the U.S. government's TSCM training facility
- Military intelligence
- Secure telephone
- Security engineering
- Telephone tapping
