= Computer vision dazzle =

Type of camouflage used to hamper facial recognition software

Computer vision dazzle, also known as CV dazzle, dazzle makeup, or anti-surveillance makeup, is a type of camouflage used to hamper facial recognition software. However, the approach draws human attention and is readily spotted by human monitors.

== Methods ==
CV dazzle combines stylized makeup, asymmetric hair, and sometimes infrared lights built in to glasses or clothing to break up detectable facial patterns recognized by computer vision algorithms.

CV dazzle has been shown to be somewhat successful at defeating face detection software in common use, including that employed by Facebook. CV dazzle attempts to block detection by facial recognition technologies such as DeepFace "by creating an 'anti-face'".

The approach uses occlusion, covering certain facial features; transformation, altering the shape or colour of parts of the face; and a combination of the two. Prominent artists employing this technique include Adam Harvey and Jillian Mayer.

== Use in protests ==
Computer vision dazzle makeup has been used by protestors in several different protest movements. Its use as a protesting aid has often been found ineffective. It may be effective to thwart computer technology, but draws human attention, is easy for human monitors to spot on security cameras, and makes it hard for protestors to blend in within a crowd. Advances in facial recognition technology make dazzle makeup increasingly ineffective.

== In popular culture ==
- Featured in the song "CV Dazzle" about mass surveillance, from the album Swooner (2016) by The Zolas.

== See also ==
- Adversarial machine learning
