= Three-dimensional face recognition =

Mode of facial recognition

3D model of a human face

Three-dimensional face recognition (3D face recognition) is a modality of facial recognition methods in which the three-dimensional geometry of the human face is used. It has been shown that 3D face recognition methods can achieve significantly higher accuracy than their 2D counterparts, rivaling fingerprint recognition.

3D face recognition has the potential to achieve better accuracy than its 2D counterpart by measuring geometry of rigid features on the face. This avoids such pitfalls of 2D face recognition algorithms as change in lighting, different facial expressions, make-up and head orientation. Another approach is to use the 3D model to improve accuracy of traditional image based recognition by transforming the head into a known view. Additionally, most 3D scanners acquire both a 3D mesh and the corresponding texture. This allows combining the output of pure 3D matchers with the more traditional 2D face recognition algorithms, thus yielding better performance (as shown in FRVT 2006).

The main technological limitation of 3D face recognition methods is the acquisition of 3D image, which usually requires a range camera. Alternatively, multiple images from different angles from a common camera (e.g. webcam) may be used to create the 3D model with significant post-processing. (See 3D data acquisition and object reconstruction.) This is also a reason why 3D face recognition methods have emerged significantly later (in the late 1980s) than 2D methods. Recently commercial solutions have implemented depth perception by projecting a grid onto the face and integrating video capture of it into a high resolution 3D model. This allows for good recognition accuracy with low cost off-the-shelf components.

3D face recognition is still an active research field, though several vendors offer commercial solutions.

== See also ==
- 3D object recognition
- Facial recognition system
