= Identix Incorporated =

- Company type: Public
- Traded as: Nasdaq: IDXX (1985-1991); AMEX: IDX (1991–2006)
- Industry: Biometric identification
- Founded: Mountain View, California, U.S. (August 1982)
- Founder: Randall C. Fowler
- Fate: Acquired by L-1 Identity Solutions in 2006 and traded on NYSE; Cash offer for NYSE traded stock by Safran (Paris), the technology became part of Morpho Systems
- Headquarters: Austin
- Area served: Worldwide
- Website: www.identyx.com

Identix Incorporated was an American biometric identification company, founded in August 1982, specialized in creating, producing, and promoting user authentication solutions through the capture and comparison of fingerprints for various security applications and personal identification purposes. Their target markets encompassed corporate enterprise security, intranet and extranet security, internet and wireless web access security, E-commerce, as well as government and law enforcement agencies.

In November 1985, Identix went public and began trading on NASDAQ as IDXX. In 1991, the stock moved to the American Stock Exchange and the trading symbol became IDX.

In October 2003, the company had 550 employees, 250 of them in Minnesota, with offices in four other U.S. states and in the United Kingdom. In January 2006, a $700M merger between Viisage and Identix was announced that would form a combined company with 700 employees. Later that year, Identix merged into L-1 Identity Solutions and traded on the NYSE until it was acquired by Safran of Paris on July 26, 2011 with a cash tender offer and it became part of Morpho S.A.S.

== History ==
In the 1960s, J. H. Wegstein at the National Bureau of Standards developed computer models for fingerprint representations (on cards mainly) to automate their analysis by computer. Wegstein's work at NBS resulted in what is now used by criminal labs everywhere, known as AFIS, Automated Fingerprint Identification Systems. Automated fingerprint identification is the process of automatically matching one or more unknown fingerprints against a database of known and unknown prints. Automated Fingerprint Identification Systems (AFIS) are primarily used by law enforcement agencies for criminal identification, the most important of which include identifying a person suspected of committing a crime or linking a suspect to other unsolved crimes.

In 1972, Randall C. Fowler began working in his garage in Redondo Beach, California to develop technology for the acquisition and recording of a person's fingerprints. The intent was to provide a more reliable technique than ink to be used initially by the FBI, and later in automated fingerprint verification systems as advances in computing power became available. Automated fingerprint verification is closely related to AFIS for use in applications such as attendance and access control systems, and it was not clear at the time if the Wegstein algorithms would be appropriate for small systems or if a different approach of analysis would be appropriate.

Several optical techniques were explored and discarded over many months. After a short time Mr. Ken Ruby joined Randy Fowler in his garage and they built prototypes of optical apparatus to acquire and record fingerprints read directly from the finger. The ensuing work produced patented technology which eventually became the underlying basis for the founding of Identix some ten years later. The resulting Identix products eventually were used by a wide variety of security and identification systems, such as for:

1. Personal identification in laptops, access control, airport security, time and attendance systems, telephone ID, and other personal ID systems.

2. Commercial and government systems such as bank transactions, customs and border control, etc.

3. Police worldwide, known as Live-Scan Machines and booking systems.

== Early years ==
Original Identix Fingerprint Identification Prototype, front view

Original Identix Fingerprint Identification Prototype, top view

The original fingerprint identification prototype was made mostly from items Mr. Fowler and Mr. Ruby found in Mr. Fowler's garage. The moving parts (cams, drive-trains, rotating spindles, articulated platforms, etc.) were all homemade. Rotation came by cannibalizing old drill motors. Old projection lights and lenses illuminated the ridges and valleys of the fingerprints along the length of the finger one line at a time. The optical elements had to be made from machined and polished plastic, but the structure that housed all the mechanics was built out of wood. By using photosensitive paper and film, the only media available at the time for recording, the result was a machine that could simulate the effects of rolling the finger and capture an entire print without distortion.

== Current applications ==
Today, Identix computerized fingerprint identification products are used by federal governments and law enforcement agencies around the world. Additionally, the verification of personal identity using fingerprints has propagated into everyday life. Fingerprint access is now used in smart phones, laptops, time and attendance systems, credit card purchases, airport security and physical access systems.
