= Technical Support Working Group =

United States interagency program

The Technical Support Working Group (TSWG) is a United States Interagency program for research and development into combating terrorism measures. Established in 1986, TSWG falls under the oversight of the Secretariat for Special Operations (headed by the Assistant Secretary of Defense for Special Operations/Low-Intensity Conflict, ASD SO/LIC) and derives some authorities for international work from the Coordinator for Counterterrorism at the Department of State. It was consolidated into the Combating Terrorism Technical Support Office (CTTSO) in 1999, which was subsequently transformed into the Irregular Warfare Technical Support Directorate (IWTSD) in 2020, and then to Capability Development and Innovation directorate (CD&I) directorate in 2025.

== Structure ==
The former TSWG under CTTSO and IWTSD was divided into 10 subgroups to address R&D requirements from various areas of technology:

- Advanced Analytics
- Chemical, Biological, Radiological, Nuclear, and Explosives
- Expeditionary Force Protection
- Explosive Ordnance Disposal and Explosive Operations
- Forensic Exploitation and Identity Operations
- Human Performance and Training
- Indirect Influence and Competition
- Protection, Survivability, and Recovery
- Surveillance, Collection, and Operations Support
- Tactical Offensive Support

The above 10 subgroups remain in the CD&I structure but are listed as legacy subgroups from IWTSD. The CD&I consists of four divisions:

- Operational Demands and Threat Analysis (ODTA)
- Irregular Warfare Capability Development (IWCD)
- Assessment of Prototypes and Experimentation (APEX)
- Global Innovation Partnerships (GIP)

== Partnerships ==
The TSWG/CTTSO had representatives from more than 50 federal organizations. The IWTSD reports collaboration with "representatives from more than 100 organizations throughout the federal government, first responders, state and local law enforcement, and the intelligence community" on its list of clients. Partner countries include Australia, Canada, Israel, Singapore, and the UK.

TSWG is a key sponsor of the Global Security Challenge at London Business School.

== Accolades ==
TSWG was credited with helping save lives in the September 11 attacks on The Pentagon. Following the 1998 United States embassy bombings, TSWG conducted research into improved blast-resistant structures and windows, some of which was incorporated into the recently renovated part of the Pentagon which was hit by the 2001 attack.

== See also ==
- Bureau of Counterterrorism
- Bureau of Diplomatic Security
- Interagency Training Center
