= Image meta search =

Type of search engine

Image meta search (or image search engine) is a type of search engine specialised on finding pictures, images, animations etc. Like the text search, image search is an information retrieval system designed to help to find information on the Internet and it allows the user to look for images etc. using keywords or search phrases and to receive a set of thumbnail images, sorted by relevancy.

According to Google, its visual search tool Google Lens handles nearly 20 billion visual searches each month as of 2024, with image searches being one of the fastest-growing query types.

The most common search engines today offer image search such as Google, Yahoo or Bing!.

== How image search works ==
A common misunderstanding when it comes to image search is that the technology is based on detecting information in the image itself. But most image search works as other search engines. The metadata of the image is indexed and stored in a large database and when a search query is performed the image search engine looks up the index, and queries are matched with the stored information. The results are presented in order of relevancy. The usefulness of an image search engine depends on the relevance of the results it returns, and the ranking algorithms are one of the keys to becoming a big player.

Modern image search engines increasingly utilize advanced technologies including Vision Transformers (ViTs), deep learning models, and multimodal AI systems that can interpret visual content directly. These systems employ computer vision and machine learning to understand and categorize image content beyond simple metadata, enabling features like visual similarity detection, object recognition, and reverse image search.

Some search engines can automatically identify a limited range of visual content, e.g. faces, trees, sky, buildings, flowers, colours etc. This can be used alone, as in content-based image retrieval, or to augment metadata in an image search.

When performing a search the user receives a set of thumbnail images, sorted by relevancy. Each thumbnail is a link back to the original web site where that image is located. Using an advanced search option the user can typically adjust the search criteria to fit their own needs, choosing to search only images or animations, color or black and white, and setting preferences on image size.

== Reverse image search ==
Reverse image search allows users to search using an image as the query input rather than text keywords. This technology analyzes the visual content of an uploaded image or image URL and finds similar or identical images across the web. Major providers include Google Lens, Bing Visual Search, Yandex Images, and TinEye. Reverse image search is commonly used for verifying image authenticity, tracking image usage, identifying sources, detecting copyright infringement, and finding product information. Certain reverse image search services apply facial recognition techniques as part of visual similarity analysis, including platforms such as PimEyes, Clearview AI, and Lenso.ai, which operate on publicly available images.

== Image search providers ==
- AltaVista (Shut down on July 8, 2013)
- Corbis
- GazoPa (similar image search, has been shut down for consumer, still available for business user)
- Google Image Search (also reverse image search)
- Live Search from Microsoft (Discontinued in 2008-2009; replaced by Bing)
- Macroglossa ( visual search engine )
- Picollator
- Picsearch
- TinEye (only reverse image search)
- Yandex Search (also reverse image search)
- Google Lens (AI-powered visual search)
- Bing Visual Search
- Pinterest Visual Search
- PimEyes (face recognition)
- Reversely.ai (AI reverse image search)

== Modern Image Recognition Technologies ==
Contemporary image search systems employ several advanced technologies:

- Content-Based Image Retrieval (CBIR): Systems that analyze visual features like color, texture, shape, and spatial relationships to find similar images
- Vision Transformers: AI models that process images holistically rather than through localized filters, providing higher accuracy and faster results
- Multimodal Learning: Systems that combine image data with text, audio, and other data sources for more comprehensive search results
- Deep Learning Models: Convolutional Neural Networks (CNNs) and pre-trained models like VGG16 and ResNet-50 for feature extraction

== See also ==
- Wikimedia Commons to search Wikipedia's images.
