= Warrant (law) =

Order that serves as a specific type of authorization

A warrant is generally an order that serves as a specific type of authorization, that is, a writ issued by a competent officer, usually a judge or magistrate, that permits an otherwise illegal act that would violate individual rights in order to enforce the law and aid in investigations; affording the person executing the writ protection from damages if the act is performed.

A warrant is usually issued by a court and is directed to a sheriff, a constable, or a police officer. Warrants normally issued by a court include search warrants, arrest warrants, and execution warrants.

== Types ==
- Arrest warrant, issued by a judge to detain someone
- Execution warrant, writ issued by a judge authorizing the death of someone
- Possessory warrant, a civil writ issued by a judge ordering property searched for, then delivered to a named person
- Search warrant, a writ issued by a judge allowing law enforcement to look inside a property
- Warrant of committal, issued by a judge ordering enforcement of a previous order against an uncooperative person or corporation
- Warrant of delivery, a civil writ issued by a judge ordering property delivered to a named person
- Warrant of execution, a writ issued by a judge allowing law enforcement officers to seize property
- Warrant of possession, an Australian judge ordered to terminate of a residential real estate tenancy

== United Kingdom ==
In the United Kingdom, some public appointments are made by warrant under the royal sign-manual, the personal signature of the monarch, on the recommendation of the government. These warrants abate (lose their force) on the death of the sovereign if they have not already been executed. This particularly applied to death warrants in the days when England authorised capital punishment. A warrant under the royal sign manual (known as an ancillary warrant) is also needed for certain types of instruments to be passed under the Great Seal of the Realm.

Perhaps the most well-known example of this occurred on 17 November 1558, when England was under the rule of a Catholic queen, Mary I, daughter of Henry VIII and the Spanish Catholic Catherine of Aragon. Several Protestants convicted of heresy had been condemned to die. They were tied to stakes in Smithfield, an open market area in central London, and the firewood bundles were about to be lit, when a royal messenger rode up to announce that Mary I had died: the warrants for their death had lost their force. The first formal act of Mary's successor, the Protestant Elizabeth I, daughter of Henry VIII and Anne Boleyn, was to decline to re-issue the warrants; the Protestants were released a few weeks later.

== United States ==
=== History ===
For many years, the English, later British, government had used a "general warrant" to enforce its laws. These warrants were broad in nature and did not have specifics as to why they were issued or what the arrest was being made for. A general warrant placed almost no limitations on the search or arresting authority of a soldier or sheriff. This concept had become a serious problem when those in power issued general warrants to have their enemies arrested when no wrongdoing had been done. The Parliament of Great Britain passed the Revenue Act 1767 (7 Geo. 3. c. 46) which reaffirmed the legality of writs of assistance, or general search warrants, and gave customs officials broad powers to search houses and businesses for smuggled goods. This law was one of the key acts of Great Britain which led to the American Revolution, and is the direct reason that the American Founding Fathers ensured that general warrants would be illegal in the United States by ratifying the Fourth Amendment to the U.S. Constitution in 1791.

=== Practice ===
Under the Fourth Amendment to the United States Constitution a warrant is broadly required, which particularly describes the place to be searched, and the persons, or things, to be seized; no warrants may be issued without probable cause, and support by testimony before a judge.

The courts have recognized many warrantless searches, including exceptions for routine administrative or inventory searches, searches made under exigent circumstances, and searches made with consent.

A typical arrest warrant in the United States will take the approximate form of: "This Court orders the Sheriff or Constable to find the named person, wherever he may be found, and deliver said person to the custody of the Court." Generally, a U.S. arrest warrant must contain the caption of the court issuing the warrant, the name (if known) of the person to be arrested, the offense charged, the date of issue, the officer(s) to whom the warrant is directed, and the signature of the magistrate.

Warrants may also be issued by other government entities, including legislatures, since most have the power to compel the attendance of their members. When a legislature issues a warrant, it is called a call of the house.

The person being investigated, arrested, or having their property seized, pursuant to a warrant is given a copy of the warrant at the time of its execution.

=== Administrative warrants ===
Codified in Section 1226(a) of Title 8 of the United States Code, Section 303 of the IIRAIRA broadly amended the use of non-judicial administrative warrants for immigration law enforcement, now commonly referred to as "ICE warrants" after the creation of U.S. Immigration and Customs Enforcement in 2003 as part of the Department of Homeland Security. While Section 1226 generally requires immigration officers to obtain administrative warrants before making immigration arrests, Section 1357(a) of Title 8 (which codifies Section 287 of the Immigration and Nationality Act of 1952) provides two exceptions that allow for warrantless arrests if an alien is suspected of having violated immigration law:

1. where "the alien…in the [immigration officer's] presence or view is entering or attempting to enter the United States [unlawfully]";
2. where "[the immigration officer] has reason to believe that the alien… is in the United States [unlawfully] and is likely to escape before a warrant can be obtained".

The U.S. Supreme Court upheld the constitutionality of Section 1226 in Demore v. Kim (2003), and lower federal courts have interpreted the "reason to believe" standard of Section 1357(a) to be functionally equivalent to the probable cause requirement of the Fourth Amendment. Such administrative warrants were originally authorized under Section 242 of the Immigration and Nationality Act of 1952, codified in Section 1252(a) of Title 8, and upheld by the Supreme Court in Abel v. United States (1960).

== See also ==
- Arrest Warrant of 11 April 2000 case, a case in public international law involving diplomatic immunity
- Quo warranto, a writ requiring the person to whom it is directed to show what authority they have for exercising some right or power (or "franchise") they claim to hold
- Warrant canary, a method used by Internet service providers to inform their customers that the provider has been served with a secret government subpoena
