= Caption =

Caption may refer to:

- Caption (text), explanatory text about specific published photos and articles
- An element of comics where words appear in a separate box; see Glossary of comics terminology § Caption
- Caption (comics convention), a small press and independent comic convention held annually in Oxford, England
- Caption (law), arrest or apprehension
- Closed captioning, used to provide the text of a show's audio portion to those who may have trouble hearing it
  - Subtitles, more general term that encompasses closed captioning but tends to refer nore to a textual translation of the foreign language audio dialog in film or other visual media
- <caption></caption>, an HTML element; see HTML element § caption

== See also ==
- Photo caption - text used to explain and elaborate on published photographs
- Intertitle, a piece text edited into a film to convey information like dialogue
