= Google Images =

Image search engine by Google Inc

- Website type: Search engine
- Available in: Multilingual (~100)
- Owners: Google, a subsidiary of Alphabet Inc.
- Website: images.google.com
- IPv6 support: Yes
- Commercial: Yes
- Registration: Optional
- Launched: July 12, 2001; 25 years ago
- Current status: Active

Google Images (previously Google Image Search) is a search engine owned by Google that allows users to search the World Wide Web for images. It was introduced on July 12, 2001, due to a demand for pictures of the green Versace dress of Jennifer Lopez worn in February 2000. In 2018, image search functionality was added.

When searching for an image, a thumbnail of each matching image is displayed. When the user clicks on a thumbnail, the image is displayed in a larger size, and users may visit the webpage on which the image is used.

== History ==
=== Beginnings and expansion (2001–2011) ===
In 2000, Google Search results were limited to simple pages of text with links. Google's developers worked on developing this further; they realized that an image search tool was required to answer "the most popular search query" they had seen to date: the green Versace dress of Jennifer Lopez worn in February 2000. Google paired a recently hired engineer Huican Zhu with product manager Susan Wojcicki (who would later become CEO of YouTube) to build the feature, and they launched Google Image Search in July 2001. That year, 250 images were indexed in Image Search. This grew to 1 billion images by 2005 and over 10 billion images by 2010.

In January 2007, Google updated the interface for the image search, where information about an image, such as resolution and URL, was hidden until the user moved the mouse cursor over its thumbnail. This was discontinued after a few weeks.

On October 27, 2009, Google Images added a feature to its image search that can be used to find similar images.

On July 20, 2010, Google made another update to the interface of Google Images, which hid image details until mouseover.

In May 2011, Google introduced a sort by subject feature for a visual category scheme overview of a search query.

In June 2011, Google Images added a "Search by Image" feature which allowed for reverse image searches directly in the image search-bar without third-party add-ons. This feature allows users to search for an image by dragging and dropping one onto the search bar, uploading one, or copy-pasting a URL that points to an image into the search bar.

=== New algorithm and accusations of censorship (2012–present) ===
On December 11, 2012, Google Images' search engine algorithm was changed once again, in the hopes of preventing pornographic images from appearing when non-pornographic search terms were used. According to Google, pornographic images would still appear as long as the term searched for was specifically pornographic; otherwise, they would not appear. While Google stated explicitly that they were "not censoring any adult content," it was immediately noted that even when entering terms such as or "Breast," no explicit results were shown. The only alternative option was to turn on an even stricter filter which would refuse to search for the aforementioned terms whatsoever. Users could also no longer exclude keywords from their searches.

On February 15, 2018, the interface was modified to meet the terms of a settlement and licensing partnership with Getty Images. The "View image" button (a deep link to the image itself on its source server) was removed from image thumbnails. This change is intended to discourage users from directly viewing the full-sized image (although doing so using a browser's context menu on the embedded thumbnail is not frustrated), and encourage them to view the image in its appropriate context (which may also include attribution and copyright information) on its respective web page. The "Search by image" button has also been downplayed, as reverse image search can be used to find higher-resolution copies of copyrighted images. Google also agreed to make the copyright disclaimer within the interface more prominent.

On August 6, 2019, the ability to filter images by their image resolutions was removed, as well as "larger than," "face," and "full color" filters.

The relevancy of search results has been examined. Most recently (October 2022), it was shown that 93.1% images of 390 anatomical structures were relevant to the search term.

== Search by Image feature ==
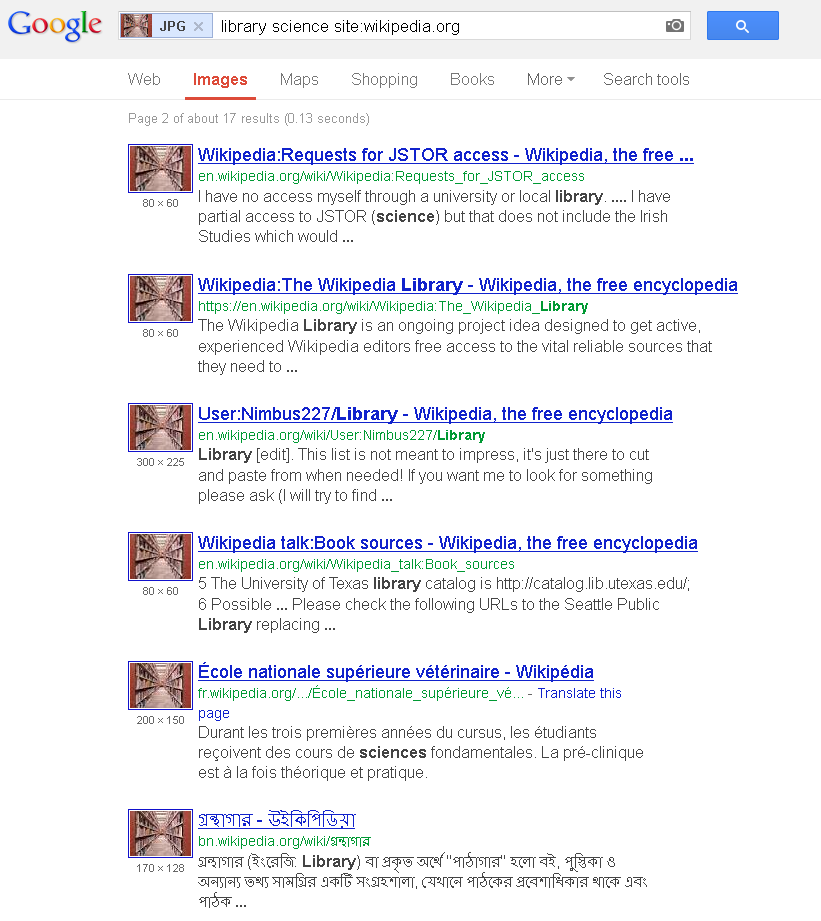
The Search by Image feature in use

Google Images has a Search by Image feature for performing reverse image searches. Unlike traditional image retrieval, this feature removes the need to type in keywords and terms into the Google search box. Instead, users search by submitting an image as their query. Results may include similar images, web results, pages with the image, and different resolutions of the image. Images on Google may take anything between 2–30 days to index if they are properly formatted.

The precision of Search by Image's results is higher if the search image is more popular. Additionally, Google Search by Image offers a "best guess for this image" based on the descriptive metadata of the results.

In 2022, the feature was replaced by Google Lens as the default visual search method on Google, and the Search by Image function remains available within Google Lens.

=== Algorithm ===
The general steps that Search by Image takes to get from a submitted image to returned search results are as follows:

1. Analyze image: The submitted image is analyzed to find identifiers such as colors, points, lines, and textures.
2. Generate query: These distinct features of the image are used to generate a search query.
3. Match image: The query is matched against the images in Google's back end.
4. Return results: Google's search and match algorithms return matching and visually similar images as results to the user.

== See also ==
- Bing Images
- Google Lens
- Google PageSpeed Tools
- Google Website Optimizer
- Image search
- Picsearch
- TinEye
- Yahoo
