= Possessory =

In legal usage, Possessory forms several compounds.

== Conventional meanings ==
Possessory means, ordinarily:

(1) of or pertaining to a possessor;
(2) arising from possession (e.g. possessory interest) or
(3) that is a possessor (e.g. possessory conservator).

== Compounds ==
- possessory interest, a temporary, qualified property in the things of which the mere possession is delivered to a person.
- possessory action, an action brought to recover possession of property. An action to recover possession of real estate, such as ejectment. An action to recover possession of personal property, such as replevin. In Louisiana, an action to recover the possession of immovable property is called a possessory action.
- possessory conservator
- possessory judgment, a judgment which establishes the right to possession. In Scots law, a judgment giving a party the right to possession until the question of possession is decided in due course of law.
- possessory lien, a lien which continues only during the possession of the lienor.
- possessory proceeding See possessory action; summary possessory proceeding.
- possessory warrant, a process resembling a search warrant used in criminal proceedings, but differing in that it is a civil process under which the property is to be delivered to the person from whom it was violently or fraudulently taken or enticed away or in whose peaceable and lawful possession it last was.
- summary possessory proceeding, a proceeding, summary in character, to which a landlord may resort for the recovery or possession of leased premises when he becomes entitled to possession.
