= List of CBIR engines =

This is a list of publicly available content-based image retrieval (CBIR) engines. These image search engines look at the content (pixels) of images in order to return results that match a particular query.

== Commercial CBIR search engines ==
Name	Description	External Image Query	Metadata Query	Index Size (Estimate, Millions of Images)	Organization Type	License (Open/Closed)
Copped	Copped Fashion Discovery Engine with reverse image search	Yes	Yes		Private Company	Closed
Pixolution	CBIR search engine, by pixolution	No	No	32M	Private Company	Closed
Picalike	CBIR engine for Mobile and eCommerce	No	No (additional filters can be added)		Private Company	Closed
Elastic Vision	Smart image searcher with content-based clustering in a visual network.	No	No		Private Company	Closed
Google Image Search	Google's CBIR system with reverse image search	Yes	Yes		Public Company	Google Custom Search API access
Yandex Image Search	Yandex CBIR system	Yes	Yes	10000M	Public Company	Closed
Baidu Image Search	Baidu's CBIR system	Yes	Yes	1000M	Public Company	Closed
ID My Pill	Automatic prescription pill identification (CBIR)	Yes	No		Private Company	Open (via API)
Imense Image Search Portal	CBIR search engine, by Imense.	No	Yes	3M	Private Company	Closed
Imprezzeo Image Search	CBIR search engine, by Imprezzeo.	No	Yes		Private Company	Closed
Incogna Image Search	CBIR search engine, by Incogna Inc.	No	Yes	100M	Private Company	Closed
MiPai similarity search engine	Online similarity search engine	Yes	Yes	100M	Individual	Closed
Piximilar	Demo engine, developed by Idee Inc.	No	No	3M	Private Company	Closed
Empora	Product comparison & shopping using CBIR for product images. Previously known as Pixsta	No	Yes	0.5M	Private Company	Closed
Shopachu	Shopping & fashion CBIR engine, by Incogna Inc.	No	Yes	1M	Private Company	Closed
TinEye	CBIR site for finding variations of web images, by Idee Inc.	Yes	No	24200M	Private Company	Open (via API)
PicScout	CBIR service tracks image usage across the web.	Yes	Yes	270M	Private Company (Getty Images)	Open (via API)
Galaxy	CBIR engine for finding product/catalogue/video frames, by Odd Concepts Inc.	Yes	Yes	35M	Private Company	Closed
eBay Image Search	Image Search for eBay Fashion	No	Yes	20M	Public Company	Closed
LykDat	LykDat Fashion Search Engine	Yes	No	13M	Private Company	Closed
Lenso.ai	AI-powered reverse image search and facial recognition search tool	Yes	Yes	60000M	Private Company	Open (via API)
IMMENSELAB	CBIR search engine by KBKGROUP.	Yes	No	10M	Private Company	Closed
Macroglossa Visual Search	CBIR visual search engine	Yes	No		Private Company	Closed
NoClone	PC image search engine and classification based on content	Yes (a set)	No		Private Company	Closed
Querbie	General purpose CBIR visual search engine	Yes	Yes	20M	Private Company	Closed
Infringement.Report	CBIR visual search engine	Yes	Yes		Private Company	Open (via API)

== CBIR research projects/demos/open source projects ==
Name	Description	External Image Query	Metadata Query	Index Size (Estimate, Millions of Images)	Organization Type	License (Open/Closed)
akiwi	akiwi is a semi-automatic image keywording tool using CBIR techniques. It was developed by HTW Berlin / pixolution GmbH	Yes	Yes	15M	University	Closed
ALIPR	Developed by Penn State University researchers	Yes	Yes		University	Closed
Anaktisi	This Web-Solution implements a new family of CBIR descriptors. These descriptors combine in one histogram color and texture information and are suitable for accurately retrieving images.	Yes	No	0.225M	University	Open
BRISC	BRISC is a recursive acronym for BRISC Really IS Cool, and is (conveniently enough) also an anagram of Content-Based Image Retrieval System.	Yes	No		University	GPL
digiKam	Extensive photo management application build on top of KDE libraries. It provides, besides many other features, reverse searches for images in the local collection, detection of duplicates and a fuzzy search by drawings.	Yes	Yes	Desktop-based	KDE	GPL
Caliph & Emir	Creation and Retrieval of images based on MPEG-7.	Yes	No	Desktop-based	University	GPL
FIRE	Open source query by visual example CBIR system. Developed at RWTH Aachen University. FIRE is a research system developed with extensibility in mind and can easily be combined with textual information retrieval systems.	No	No		University	Open
GNU Image Finding Tool	Query by example image search system.	Yes	No	Desktop-based	GNU	GPL
ISSBP	Similar Image Search by Imense plugin for Adobe Bridge, free beta.	Yes	Yes	free-beta limited to 4k images	Private Company	Closed
img(Rummager)	Image retrieval Engine (Freeware Application).	Yes	No	Desktop-based	Individual	Closed
imgSeek	photo collection manager and viewer with content-based search and many other features.	Yes	No		Individual	GPL
IKONA	Generic CBIR system - INRIA - IMEDIA	Yes	Yes		University	Closed
IOSB	Image retrieval demonstration software of Fraunhofer IOSB (Germany)	Yes	No	Desktop-based	Research Institute	Closed
LIRE	Java GPL library for content based image retrieval based on Lucene including multiple low level global and local features and different indexing strategies including bag of visual words and hashing.	Yes	Yes		University	GPL
Lucignolo	Image similarity search engine using only the native full-text search engine Lucene.	Yes	Yes	106M	Research Institute	Closed
Luigi	Large Histopathological Image Retrieval System developed at University of Tokyo	Yes	No	0.3M	University	Closed
MIFile	Image similarity search engine based on MI File (Metric Inverted File) developed at ISTI-CNR. Source code of the MI File.	No	No	100M	Research Institute	Open
MUVIS	CBIR System at TUT- Tampere University of Technology.	Yes	No	Desktop-based	University	Closed
Pastec	C++ LGPL index and search engine for near-duplicate image retrieval that uses bag of visual words with ORB features.	Yes	Yes		Private company	LGPL
PIBE	An adaptive image browsing system that provides users with an intuitive, easy-to-use, structured view of an image collection and complements it with ideas from the field of adaptable content-based similarity search. A hierarchical view of images (the Browsing Tree) that can be customized according to user preferences is provided.	Yes	No		University	Closed
PicsLikeThat	Image search using visual similarity search and sorting combined with a recommender system. (Cooperation of pixolution GmbH, fotolia and HTW Berlin)	No	No	12M	University	Closed
PIRIA	CBIR tool developed at CEA-LIST, LVIC (Vision and Content Engineering Laboratory).	Yes	Yes	1000 M	University	Closed
Pixcavator	Similar image search based on topological image analysis	Yes	No	Desktop-based	Private company	Closed
QuickLook	Visual information retrieval system with relevance feedback	No	Yes		University	Closed
RETIN	Interactive images retrieval system - CNRS - ETIS Lab., MIDI Team	No	No		University	Closed
Retrievr	Search and explore in a selection of Flickr images by drawing a rough sketch or uploading an image.	No	No		University	Closed
SHIATSU	A novel system for automatic video tagging which is based on shot boundaries detection and hierarchical annotation processes. The tagging phase assigns semantic concepts to both shot sequences and whole videos, by exploiting visual features extracted from key frames.	Yes	Yes		University	Closed
SIMBA	demo of system by the Albert-Lwigs-Universitet Freiburg (Germany) Inst. for Pattern Recognition and Image Processing	Yes	No	0.002M	University	Closed
TagProp	The demonstration of image annotation tool TagProp in ICCV2009 for image set: Corel 5k ESP Game IAPR TC-12 and MIR Flickr.	No	Yes		Institute	Closed
VIRaL	Visual Image Retrieval and Localization: A visual search engine that, given a query image, retrieves photos depicting the same object or scene under varying viewpoint or lighting conditions. Using Flickr photos of urban scenes, it automatically estimates where a picture is taken, suggests tags, identifies known landmarks or points of interest, and links to relevant Wikipedia articles. It currently supports 39 cities around the world.	Yes	Yes	2.221M	University	Closed
Windsurf	A general framework for efficiently processing content-based image queries with particular emphasis to the region-based paradigm; it provides an environment where different alternatives of the paradigm can be implemented, allowing such implementations to be compared on a fair basis, from the points of view of both effectiveness and efficiency.	Yes	No		University	Open but not free
