= Zanran =

Search engine

Zanran is a search engine for data and statistics. Zanran's focus is on finding graphs, charts and tables on the Internet, which distinguishes it from other search engines such as Google, Bing, etc. Unlike a typical search engine, the results—graphs, tables, etc.—can be previewed by mouse-hovering over the thumbnails.

== History ==
In 2006, the founders, Dr Yves Dassas and Jon Goldhill, started developing the technology that makes Zanran possible. A limited beta ran, starting in November 2010. The service was launched as a public beta version in May 2011.

== Technology ==
Zanran has developed two technologies specifically for this application:

1. Image ‘classification’ is the ability for a computer to decide whether an image is a graph, a pie-chart etc. as opposed to a photograph or a cartoon. The Zanran algorithms work to over 95% accuracy. This is important because most images on the web are not graphs and otherwise there would be a large number of false positives.
2. Text extraction is the process of taking the most appropriate text to describe the graph. This contrasts with a normal search engine where an entire HTML page might be included.

These processes are the subject of Zanran's UK patent. The image processing in particular takes a great deal of computing power. Zanran runs on the Amazon cloud, and uses hundreds of machines at a time.

The service is English-language only as of December 2011.

== The company ==
Zanran Ltd is based in London, UK. It was financed by the founders prior to a private angel investment round in March 2010.

== Other data-search on the Internet ==
Other specialists in the data-search space include WolframAlpha, Infochimps, and Timetric.
