= V7 (company) =

London-based software company

V7 Ltd.
- Trade name: V7 Labs
- Company type: Private limited company
- Industry: Computer Software
- Predecessor: Aipoly
- Founded: 2018; 7 years ago in London, United Kingdom
- Founder: Alberto Rizzoli; Simon Edwardsson
- Headquarters: London, United Kingdom
- Products: V7 Darwin; V7 Go
- Website: www.v7labs.com

V7 Labs (legally V7 Ltd) is a London-based software company that develops tools for annotating visual data and automating document-based workflows using large language models. The company originated as Aipoly, founded in San Francisco in 2015, and rebranded as V7 after relocating to London in 2018.

== History ==
The firm launched as Aipoly in 2015, releasing a mobile application that generated audio descriptions of objects for visually impaired users and later developing computer-vision systems for retail. In 2018 it moved to London and adopted the name V7.

The company's Darwin platform includes image-annotation tools and model-training workflows incorporating active learning. In 2022 the company released a Chrome extension intended to detect AI-generated profile images.

In April 2024 V7 introduced V7 Go, a platform for automating document and office workflows using large language models. Its users uploads files and it issues natural-language instructions, with applications such as invoice processing and document summarization.

== Operations ==
V7’s software has been deployed in medical imaging and related healthcare workflows, including dataset creation and annotation for training models to identify findings on diagnostic scans and support DICOM-based pipelines. It's also used in pharmaceutical manufacturing, such as computer-vision systems for visual inspection tasks on production lines.

=== Technology ===
V7's applications are used in document processing, where its software automates steps such as information extraction, invoice processing, and document summarization through large language models and multi-step workflows. These applications have also been deployed for legal document review, including extracting structured data from contracts and due-diligence materials.

V7 technology is also used in agricultural robotics, where the platform supports dataset creation and model iteration for crop identification tasks.

== See also ==
- Computer vision
- Data labeling
