= Image collection exploration =

Image collection exploration is a mechanism to explore large digital image repositories. The huge amount of digital images produced every day through different devices such as mobile phones bring forth challenges for the storage, indexing and access to these repositories. Content-based image retrieval (CBIR) has been the traditional paradigm to index and retrieve images. However, this paradigm suffers of the well known semantic gap problem. Image collection exploration consists of a set of computational methods to represent, summarize, visualize and navigate image repositories in an efficient, effective and intuitive way.

== Summarization ==
Automatic summarization consists in finding a set of images from a larger image collection that represents such collection. Different methods based on clustering have been proposed to select these image prototypes (summary). The summarization process addresses the problem of selecting a representative set of images of a search query or in some cases, the overview of an image collection.

== Visualization ==
Image collection visualization is the process of visualize a set of images using a visualization metaphor, in which an image similarity function is used to represent image relations in a visualization layout. Information visualization is an active area that investigates new ways to visualize information by using visualization metaphors. Particularly, new ways of visualizing image collections are being investigated, which propose conventional and unconventional visualization metaphors. If the images are sorted according to their similarities, a hierarchic image browsing approach similar to cartographic services such as Google Maps can be used. picsbuffet is an online demo of such an approach.

== Interaction ==
Image collection interaction consists in offering users mechanisms to feedback image search systems. In this interaction process, the system learns from user feedback to retrieve results more precise and relevant to the user.
