= Google Lens =

Image recognition tool developed by Google

- Screenshot The Wikipedia logo used as the subject for Drag to search on Google Chrome
- Developer: Google
- Release: 4 October 2017; 9 years ago
- Stable release: 1.18 (Build 250731009) / 5 August 2025; 15 months ago
- Operating system: Android, iOS, Microsoft Windows, macOS, ChromeOS, Linux
- Predecessor: Google Goggles
- Available in: Lens is able to translate text into most languages supported by Google Translate. Shopping results are available in Austria, Australia, Belgium, Brazil, Canada, Chile, Colombia, Czech Republic, Denmark, France, Germany, India, Indonesia, Ireland, Italy, Japan, Malaysia, Mexico, Netherlands, New Zealand, Norway, Philippines, Poland, Portugal, Russia, Singapore, South Africa, South Korea, Spain, Sweden, Switzerland, Turkey, UAE, United Kingdom, and the United States.
- Website: lens.google

Google Lens is an image recognition technology developed by Google, designed to bring up relevant information related to objects it identifies using visual analysis based on a neural network. First announced during Google I/O 2017, it was first provided as a standalone app, later being integrated into Google Camera but was reportedly removed in October 2022. It has also been integrated with the Google Photos and Google Assistant app and with Bard (now Gemini) as of 2023.

== Features ==
=== Lens ===
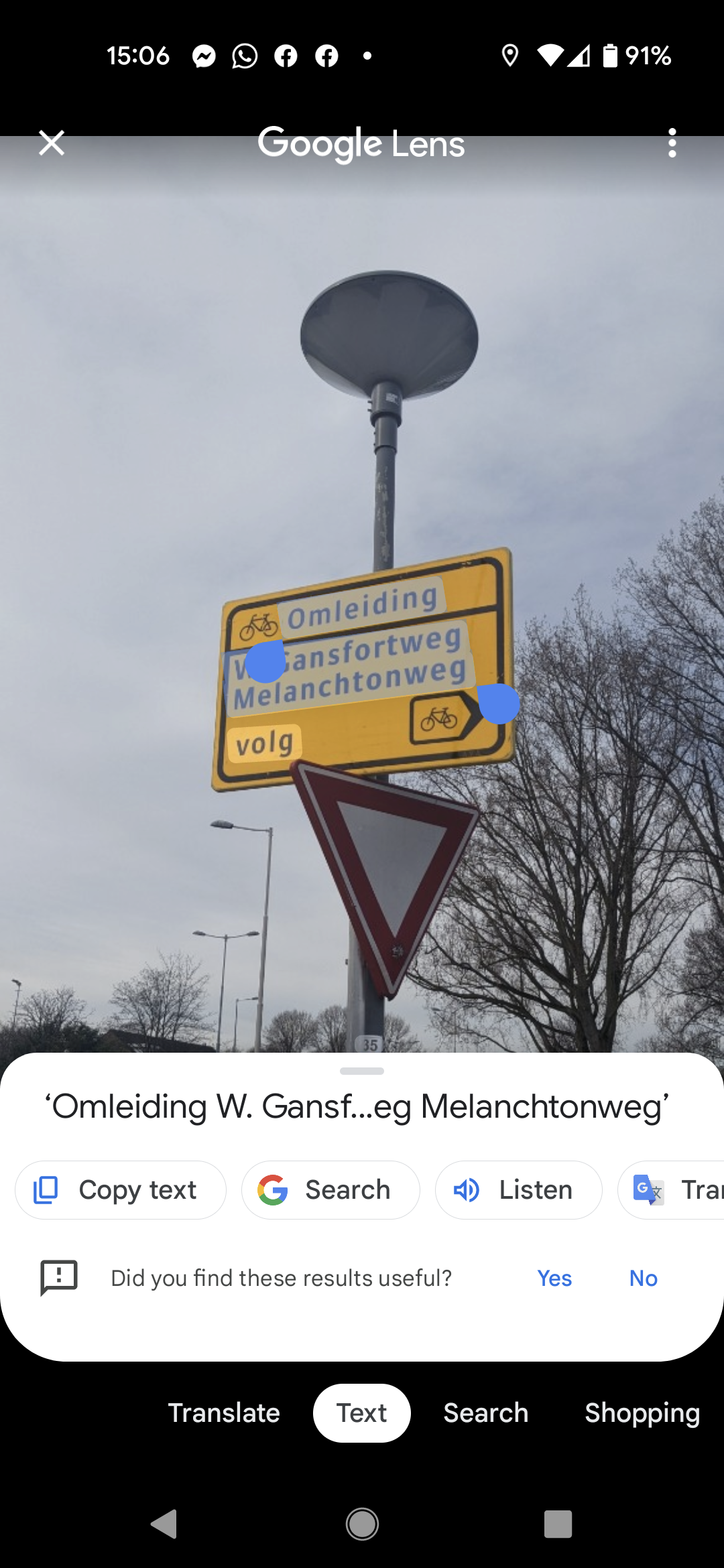
Text recognition on the Android app

When pointing the phone's camera at an object, Google Lens will try to identify the object by reading barcode, QR codes, labels and text, and show relevant search results, web pages, and information. For example, when pointing the camera at a Wi-Fi label containing a network name and password, it will automatically connect to the scanned Wi-Fi network. Lens can also use images to identify text and can find results from Google Search or translate the text with Google Translate in augmented reality. Lens is also integrated with the Google Photos and Google Assistant apps.

The service originally launched as Google Goggles, a previous app that functioned similarly but less capably. Lens uses more advanced deep learning routines that provide recognition capability, similarly to other apps like Bixby Vision (for Samsung devices released after 2016) and Image Analysis Toolset (IAT). During Google I/O 2019, Google announced these new features:

- recognizing and recommending items on a menu
- calculating tips and bill splits
- showing how to prepare food from a recipe
- using speech synthesis (text to speech)

=== Circle to Search ===
On January 17, 2024 at the Galaxy Unpacked event, Samsung Electronics and Google announced Circle to Search, a new feature that allows users to search the web by circling images that features Lens integration. The feature was originally just on the Samsung Galaxy S24 and the Pixel 8, but expanded to other phones from those manufacturers, including Pixel 9 and Samsung Galaxy S25, and foldable models such as the Galaxy Z Fold 6 and Galaxy Z Flip 6.

== Availability ==
Google officially launched Google Lens on October 4, 2017, with app previews pre-installed into the Google Pixel 2, not yet widely available for other devices. In November 2017, the feature began rolling out into the Google Assistant for Pixel and Pixel 2 phones. A preview of Lens has also been implemented into the Google Photos app for Pixel phones. On March 5, 2018, Google officially released Google Lens to Google Photos on non-Pixel phones. Support for Lens in the iOS version of Google Photos was made on March 15, 2018. Beginning in May 2018, Google Lens was made available within Google Assistant on OnePlus devices as well as being integrated into camera apps of various Android phones. A standalone Google Lens app was made available on Google Play in June 2018. Device support is limited, although it is not clear which devices are not supported or why. It requires Android Marshmallow (6.0) or newer. On December 10, 2018, Google rolled out the Lens visual search feature to the Google app for iOS. In 2022, Google Lens gradually replaced the reverse image search functionality of Google Images, first by replacing it in Google Chrome and later by making it officially available as a web application. A July 2023 update to Google's chatbot Bard integrated Google Lens, allowing users to contextualize their prompts by uploading images and adding image retrieval functionality.

== See also ==
- Bixby Vision
