= Google Goggles =

Image recognition application created by Google

- Developer: Google
- Release: October 5, 2010; 16 years ago
- Final release: 1.9.4 / August 20, 2018; 8 years ago
- Operating system: Android, iOS
- Successor: Google Lens
- Size: 2.7 MB
- Website: www.google.com/mobile/goggles, defunct, redirects to about.google/products/

Google Goggles was an image recognition mobile app developed by Google. It was used for searches based on pictures taken by handheld devices. For example, taking a picture of a famous landmark searches for information about it, or taking a picture of a product's barcode would search for information on the product.

== History ==
Google Goggles was developed for use on Google's Android operating system for mobile devices. While initially only available in a beta version for Android phones, Google announced its plans to enable the software to run on other platforms, notably iPhone and BlackBerry devices. Google did not discuss a non-handheld format. Google product manager Shailesh Nalawadi indicated that Google wanted Goggles to be an application platform, much like Google Maps, not just a single product. On October 5, 2010, Google announced availability of Google Goggles for devices running iOS 4.0. In a May 2014 update to Google Mobile for iOS, the Google Goggles feature was removed.

At Google I/O 2017, a similar app, Google Lens was announced that has similar functions as Goggles and uses the Google Assistant.

The app was officially discontinued on August 20, 2018 with its last update directing users to download Google Lens or Google Photos upon launching the app.

== Features ==
The system could identify various labels or landmarks, allowing users to learn about such items without needing a text-based search. The system could identify products barcodes or labels that allow users to search for similar products and prices, solve sudokus from photographs, and save codes for future reference, similar to the CueCat from late 1990s. The system also recognized printed text and uses optical character recognition (OCR) to produce a text snippet, and in some cases even translate the snippet into another language.

In December 2011, the Metropolitan Museum of Art announced its collaboration with Google to use Google Goggles for providing information about the museum's artworks through direct links to the website of the museum.
