= Picollator =

Recogmission LLC
- Type: Private
- Industry: Search Engine
- Founded: Samara, Russian Federation (2006)
- Headquarters: London, UK, Russian Federation
- Products: Web search engine, Image search
- Website: www.recogmission.com

Picollator is an Internet search engine that performs searches for web sites and multimedia by visual query (image) or text, or a combination of visual query and text. Picollator recognizes objects in the image, obtains their relevance to the text and vice versa, and searches in accordance with all information provided.

== Description ==
Picollator identifies human faces in the images and creates a database of people's faces. This allows the user to search for other images of the submitted person, lookalikes and/or similar images in images found on websites. Picollator can be used in any language.

== History ==
2006 – Recogmission LLC developed a desktop application for photo collections management. The system automatically classifies, manages and retrieves photographs stored locally or in corporate databases.

2007 – Recogmission started Picollator multimedia search engine project, now in Beta stage.

2008 – Picollator.mobi is launched—a new universal search engine for mobile phones.

2009 – Recogmission opens the web based content filter service piFilter.com, which inherited some pattern recognition technologies from Picollator.

== Features ==
Most image search engines match user textual query and picture tags. Picollator is based on a different approach. Patterns and objects found in the image are stored in its database, therefore it is able to recognise the contents of the image and compare it to other images to find similarities.

To search for multimedia information, the user may submit

- Sample image to find images with relevant people
- Image to find web resources
- Text to find images
- Text to find web resources
- Text and Image to find images and/or web resources.

== Company ==
ru:Recogmission LLC has developed an indexing engine for multimedia information search based on the visual query.

Recogmission develops solutions for multimedia information (image, text and video) indexing and searching on the web and in corporate environments.
