= Warrant of possession =

Australian real estate law

A warrant of possession under Australian law can be issued after a lessor or agent has applied for, and received, a termination order to end a residential tenancy. The lessor or agent should therefore apply for this warrant when applying for a termination order.

== Queensland ==
A warrant of possession has to be served by a police officer. The Queensland Civil and Administrative Tribunal will forward the warrant of possession to the local police station and advise all the parties that it has been issued. The warrant of possession will specify when the warrant may be executed, usually within a two-week period. After this, the warrant expires and another application is required.

Lessors or agents should contact their local police station to keep informed about the process and for further information about how the warrant will be executed. In Queensland, tenants can contact the Queensland Statewide Tenancy Advice and Referral Service (QSTARS) or Tenants Queensland to clearly understand the process.
