= Photo caption =

Text used to explain and elaborate on published photographs

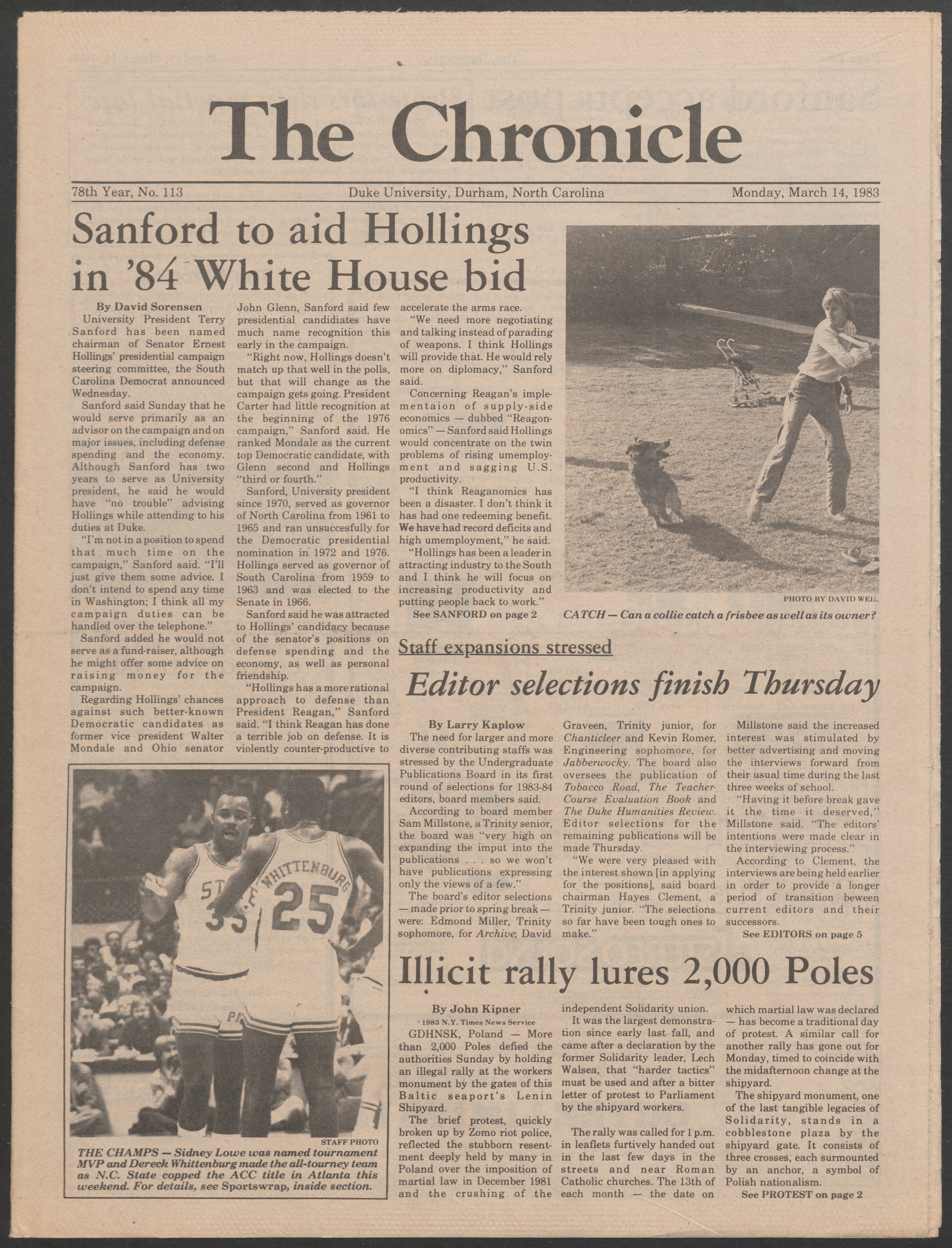
Caption examples

Photo captions, also known as cutlines, are a few lines of text used to explain and elaborate on published photographs. In some cases captions and cutlines are distinguished, where the caption is a short (usually one-line) title/explanation for the photo, while the cutline is a longer, prose block under the caption, generally describing the photograph, giving context, or relating it to the article. Captions can also be generated by automatic image captioning software.

== Social context ==
The purpose of a photo caption is to be descriptive enough to accurately explain what is being shown in the photograph without being too obvious. They provide context for the photo so that readers understand the significance behind the photo. Captions can highlight details that are not made explicit in the photograph itself.

Captions are often read more frequently than any other text in a newspaper, because of their succinct and descriptive nature. Over time, editors have chosen to place photographs and captions together, to provide an explanation to readers that will help them understand what they see. In newspapers that aim to for a neutral point of view, photographs related to contentious topics are accompanied by captions that contain objective language.

== Automated captions ==
At present, photo captions are also used on social media networks to describe photo content. When users post on social networks, they intend to create a fitting caption: an automatic caption generation system can make the process easier. Automated caption generators can be used in semantic image search, chatbots, and may help people with visual impairments. However, research indicates that generated photo captions may not be suitable for social networks, as the captions may be more descriptive rather than using context from the photo.

== Modern usage ==
Modern day Photo captioning has expanded beyond traditional media like newspapers and magazines, and has become a more distinguished feature on Digital platforms such as Instagram and Facebook. Photo captioning has evolved beyond simply describing images to becoming a tool for attracting and increasing audience engagement. Viewers are more likely to move from post to post if its image and caption fails to capture their attention. Linguistic features, contextualization and cultural references influence how a caption is interpreted by a viewer. A caption can be perceived differently depending on an individual’s cultural background, personal experience, and social context. Additionally, accessible language, abbreviations and colloquial expression can make a caption more relatable and conversational. Emotional elements, such as humour, sadness and excitement has shown to encourage viewers to interact with the caption or share the content. As a result, photo captioning functions as both a descriptive and communicative tool, shaping how visual information is understood and interpreted within the digital media environment.

== See also ==
- Caption (disambiguation)
