= Automatic image annotation =

Process which assigns captioning to a digital image

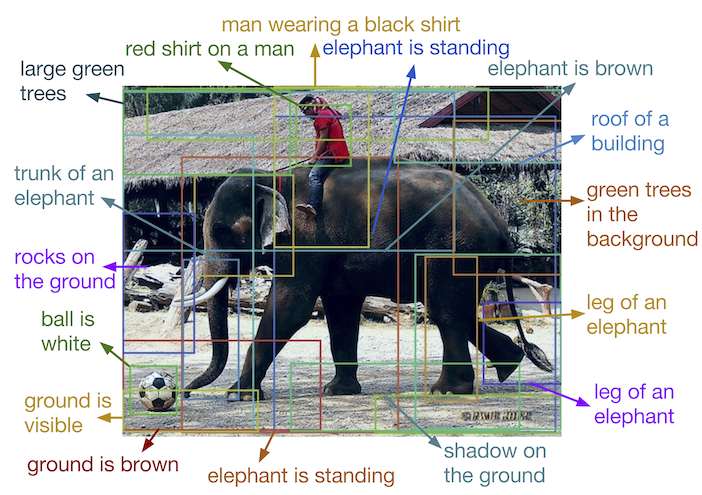
Output of DenseCap "dense captioning" software, analysing a photograph of a man riding an elephant

Automatic image annotation (also known as automatic image tagging or linguistic indexing) is the process by which a computer system automatically assigns metadata in the form of captioning or keywords to a digital image. This application of computer vision techniques is used in image retrieval systems to organize and locate images of interest from a database.

This method can be regarded as a type of multi-class image classification with a very large number of classes - as large as the vocabulary size. Typically, image analysis in the form of extracted feature vectors and the training annotation words are used by machine learning techniques to attempt to automatically apply annotations to new images. The first methods learned the correlations between image features and training annotations. Subsequently, techniques were developed using machine translation to attempt to translate the textual vocabulary into the 'visual vocabulary,' represented by clustered regions known as blobs. Subsequent work has included classification approaches, relevance models, and other related methods.

The advantages of automatic image annotation versus content-based image retrieval (CBIR) are that queries can be more naturally specified by the user. At present, Content-Based Image Retrieval (CBIR) generally requires users to search by image concepts such as color and texture or by finding example queries. However, certain image features in example images may override the concept that the user is truly focusing on. Traditional methods of image retrieval, such as those used by libraries, have relied on manually annotated images, which is expensive and time-consuming, especially given the large and constantly growing image databases in existence.

== See also ==
- Content-based image retrieval
- Object categorization from image search
- Object detection
- Outline of object recognition
