= Picsearch =

Swedish image search company

- Type: Private
- Industry: Search Engine, Streaming Video
- Founded: Stockholm, Sweden (2000)
- Defunct: 2022
- Headquarters: Stockholm, Sweden
- Products: image search, Online Video Platform
- Website: www.picsearch.com Screen9 - Online Video Platform

Picsearch was a Swedish company which developed and provided image search services for large websites. The image search services developed by Picsearch power several major Internet companies, such as Lycos. Other Picsearch customers include regional search portals in Germany, Turkey and an Arabic language portal. Customers outside the sphere of search portals included telecoms, entertainment sites, e-commerce, sport websites, yellow pages and communities. In January 2022, the official website was changed to declare "We had a great ride. R.I.P. Picsearch 2000 - 2022" and its usual service pages went dark.

Picsearch also developed an Online Video Platform under the brand name Screen9 which is used for video communities, vlogging (video blog), video reviews on e-commerce sites, corporate video presentations, news videos and virtual showings on real estate portals. Screen9 continues to be in business. The video streaming service includes flash player, upload, transcoding, hosting and streaming. Some features of the service are flexible quality (bitrate, resolution, codec), user interaction (action buttons, ad support, rating etc.) and branding possibilities (logotype, off-site embedding, player branding, mobile support etc.).

== History ==
Picsearch was developed and founded in the year, 1999–2000, at Linköping University by two engineering students Nils Andersson and Robert Risberg, who were working on their Master of Science in Applied Physics and Electrical Engineering. Their goal was to improve relevancy, create a larger index, and to introduce family-friendly and spam filtered results. The company was launched in 2000, and the first public version of the image search engine was available in September 2001, around the same time that Google launched its services. Ditto.com was the first public image search engine.

== Features ==
The Picsearch service was slightly more expensive than Google and Yahoo, but according to many of its licensing partners, provided a higher relevance and better family-friendliness.

=== Coverage ===
Picsearch was notable for providing one of the largest searchable indexes, providing over 3 billion images in 2017. This compares with Google (2.2 billion images) and Yahoo (1.6 billion images).

=== Family-Friendliness ===
Family-friendliness implies that all sexual nudity, pornography and violence was removed by an automatic filter. Picsearch also offered an image removal service for those wanting their images removed.

=== Localization ===
Picsearch services included localization features to tailor the search service to regional markets.

=== Language Support ===
Picsearch supported the following languages: Latin alphabet, Chinese characters, Cyrillic script, Arabic alphabet, Brahmic scripts, Hangul, Greek alphabet and Hebrew Alphabet.

== Environmental policy ==
On the 22nd of March 2007, Picsearch implemented a new environmental policy making them the first carbon neutral search engine in the world. The Picsearch initiative was followed by promises from Yahoo in April and Google in June to go carbon neutral by the end of 2007.

The policy consists of four steps:

1. Picsearch plants 1000 new trees for every gigawatt-hour consumed.
2. Picsearch buys and holds in trust 2 acres (8,100 m^{2}) of old growth forest for every gigawatt-hour consumed.
3. Picsearch only uses electricity that is carbon free and follows the highest standard of production.
4. Picsearch buys carbon credits equivalent to all the energy that Picsearch consumes.

== Censoring child pornography ==
In July 2007 the Swedish National Criminal Police started working with Picsearch to incorporate a special filter, which will block the visibility of 4000 websites with commercial child pornography. Introducing the filter on Picsearch and other search services, the police authorities are trying to make it more difficult for users to find child pornography. The initiative has sparked some discussion in Sweden and Japan as to whether or not the police authorities are extending their powers, whether the filter threatens freedom of speech, and whether the real reason for introducing the filter is to establish a precedent for denying access to other information as well.

== Development and patents ==
Picsearch has developed all of its search service in-house, including spidering of the Web, indexing of image, video, and audio files, and an efficient way of distributing the results to users from all parts of the world. Picsearch's algorithms are patented in Sweden and patent-pending in the EU and the United States.
