= Warrant of delivery =

Warrant of delivery is a method of enforcing court judgments used in the legal systems of the United Kingdom and Canada.

If someone has an item or goods belonging to another, who wishes these things to be returned, a warrant of delivery is the method to use to force return of items to their lawful owner. The lawful owner must have a court judgment or order that says the items are to be returned. The lawful owner must pay a fee to the court and send the court a request for a warrant of delivery.

No hearing is needed, as the court bailiff will simply contact the person who has the items and set an appointment to remove them.

== See also ==
- Possessory warrant
