= GazoPa =

- Website type: Image search engine
- Available in: English
- Website: http://www.gazopa.com/
- Launched: September 10, 2008
- Current status: Closed, June 23, 2011

GazoPa was an image search engine that used features from an image to search for and identify similar images which closed in 2011.

GazoPa began in TechCrunch50 in 2008 before launching into a state of open beta in 2009. GazoPa branched out and released a flower photo community site called "GazoPa Bloom" in 2010. This site was for exploring flower images and, if users need help identifying a flower, uploading images for other people try to identify them.

Both sites closed to the public in 2011 when the company decided to focus on other areas of their business.

== See also ==
- Content-based image retrieval
