= Possessory action =

In legal usage, a possessory action may refer to:

An action brought to recover possession of property.
An action to recover possession of real estate, such as ejectment or forcible entry and detainer.
An action to recover possession of personal property, such as replevin.
In Louisiana, an action to recover, maintain, or get into the possession of immovable property or of a right upon or growing out of it. The dispossessed party must have had quiet and undisturbed possession for a year and a day of the property before bringing an action.
