= TinEye =

Reverse image search engine

- Website type: Reverse image search engine
- Available in: multilingual
- Headquarters: Toronto
- Country of origin: Canada
- Owners: Idée, Inc.
- Founders: Paul Bloore, Leila Boujnane
- Website: https://tineye.com
- Commercial: Yes
- Registration: Optional
- Launched: 8 May 2008
- Current status: Active

TinEye is a reverse image search engine developed and offered by Idée, Inc., a company based in Toronto, Ontario, Canada. It was the first image search engine on the web to use image identification technology rather than keywords, metadata or watermarks. TinEye allows users to search not using keywords but with images. Upon submitting an image, TinEye creates a "unique and compact digital signature or fingerprint" of the image and matches it with other indexed images. This procedure is able to match even heavily edited versions of the submitted image, but will not usually return similar images in the results.

== History ==
Idée, Inc. was founded by Leila Boujnane and Paul Bloore in 1999. Idée launched the service on May 6, 2008 and went into open beta in August that year. While computer vision and image identification research projects began as early as the 1980s, the company claims that TinEye is the first web-based image search engine to use image identification technology. The service was created with copyright owners and brand marketers as the intended user base, to look up unauthorized use and track where the brands are showing up respectively.

In June 2014, TinEye claimed to have indexed more than five billion images for comparisons. However, this is a relatively small proportion of the total number of images available on the World Wide Web.

As of September 2025, TinEye's search results claim to have over 77.6 billion images indexed for comparison.

== Technology ==
A user uploads an image to the search engine (the upload size is limited to 20 MB) or provides a URL for an image or for a page containing the image. The search engine will look up other usage of the image in the internet, including modified images based upon that image, and report the date and time at which they were posted. TinEye does not recognize outlines of objects or perform facial recognition, but recognizes the entire image, and some altered versions of that image. This includes smaller, larger, and cropped versions of the image. TinEye has shown itself capable of retrieving different images from its database of the same subject, such as famous landmarks.

TinEye is capable of searching for images in JPEG, PNG, WebP, GIF, BMP and TIFF format.

Results generated from TinEye include the total number of matches in their database, a preview image, and the URL to each match. TinEye can sort results by best match, most changed, biggest image, newest, and oldest.

User registration is optional and offers storage of the user's previous queries. Other features include embeddable widgets and bookmarklets. TinEye has also released their commercial API.

== Usage ==
TinEye's ability to search the web for specific images (and modifications of those images) makes it a potential tool for the copyright holders of visual works to locate infringements on their copyright. It also creates a possible avenue for people who are looking to make use of imagery under orphan works to find the copyright holders of that imagery. Being that orphan works can be defined as "copyrighted works whose owners are difficult or impossible to identify and/or locate," the use of TinEye could potentially remove the orphan work status from online images that can be found in its database.

=== Fact-checking ===
It has been recommended by fact-checkers as a useful resource in attempts to verify the origin of images. As of 2019, TinEye specialized in copyright violations and finding exact versions of images online.

== See also ==
- Content-based image retrieval
