= Concept-based image indexing =

Method of image retrieval

Concept-based image indexing, also variably named as "description-based" or "text-based" image indexing/retrieval, refers to retrieval from text-based indexing of images that may employ keywords, subject headings, captions, or natural language text (Chen & Rasmussen, 1999). It is opposed to Content-based image retrieval. Indexing is a technique used in CBIR.

Chu (2001) confirms that there exist two distinctive research groups employing the content-based and description-based approaches, respectively. However, research in the content-based domain is currently dominating in the field, while the other approach has less visibility.

== See also ==
- Document classification
- Subject (documents)
