= Caption (law) =

Caption was a term used (especially in Scotland), for arrest or apprehension.

Caption also has an old legal use, to signify the part of an indictment, etc., which shows where, when and by what authority it is taken, found or executed; so its opening or heading. From this is derived the modern sense of the heading of an article in a book or newspaper.

In accordance with the American Heritage Dictionary, the word is still used in the United States to indicate: "the heading of a pleading or other document that identifies the parties, court, term, and number of the action."

The word is derived from Old French caption or Latin captio (as an adapted borrowing).
