= Possessory warrant =

In United States legal usage, a possessory warrant is a process resembling a search warrant used in criminal proceedings, but differing in that it is a civil process under which the property is to be delivered to the person from whom it was violently or fraudulently taken or enticed away or in whose peaceable and lawful possession it last was.

== See also ==
- Warrant of delivery
