= Caption (text) =

Graphic device to add descriptive text to visuals

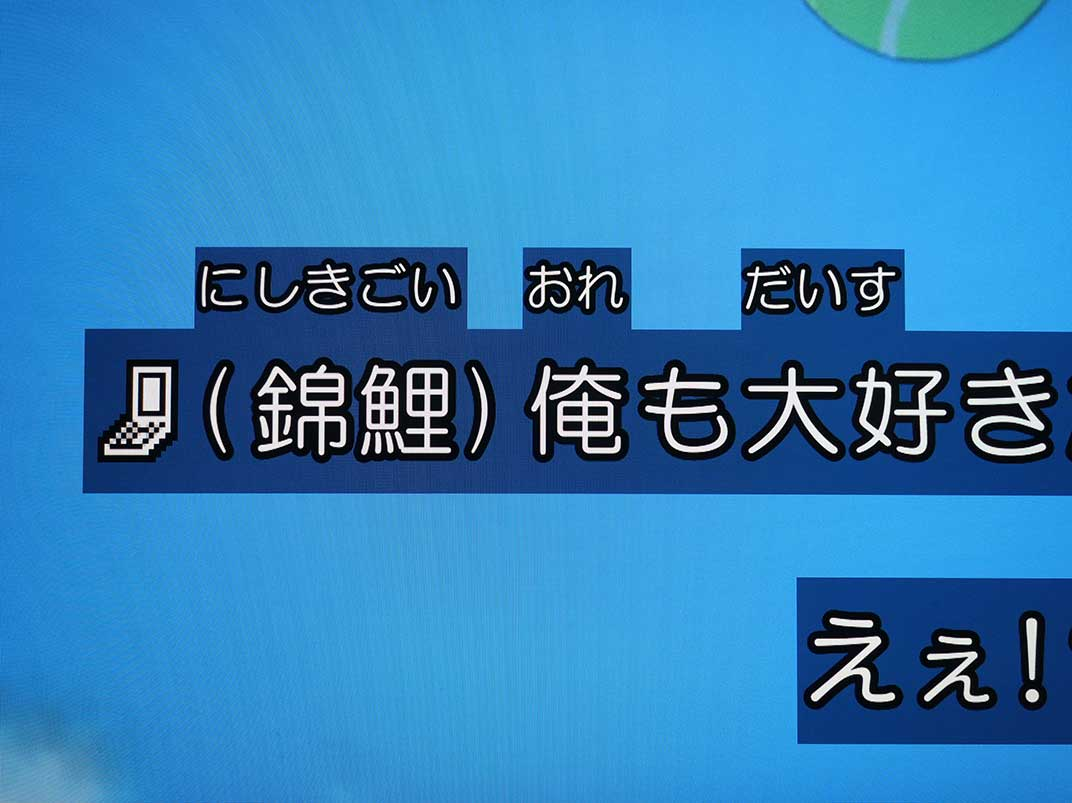
Japanese TV closed caption using Gaiji

A caption is a short descriptive or explanatory text, usually one or two sentences long, which accompanies a photograph, picture, map, graph, pictorial illustration, figure, table or some other form of graphic content contained in a book, newspaper, or magazine article.

A caption of an image is usually placed directly below the image. A caption for a table is usually positioned above the table. In magazines and similar publications, a caption can be placed opposite the picture or sometimes on top of the picture itself.

In technical writing, the caption usually contains the number of the figure or the table, as well as lengthy and complete details about the figure. The source of the information in a caption is usually cited at the end of it.
