= One shot =

One shot may refer to:

== Film and television ==
- One-shot film, a feature film shot in one long take with no edits, or manufactured to look like so
- One Shot (2005 film), a Sri Lankan action film directed by Ranjan Ramanayake
- One Shot, a 2014 American sci-fi action film directed by John Lyde (IMDb #tt3343350) also marketed as Sniper Elite
- One Shot (2021 film), a British action thriller film directed by James Nunn
- Jack Reacher (film) (previously titled One Shot), a 2012 American thriller film adapted from Lee Child's novel (see below)
- Marvel One-Shots, short films in the Marvel Cinematic Universe
- One Shot, a 2016–2017 program broadcast by BET

== Literature ==
- One-shot (comics), a single-issue comic book which is not published as a part of a series or mini-series
- One Shot (novel), a 2005 Jack Reacher novel by Lee Child

== Music ==
- One Shot (EP) or the title song, by B.A.P.

=== Songs ===
- "One Shot" (The Brotherhood song), 1996
- "One Shot" (JLS song), 2010
- "One Shot" (Mabel song), 2018
- "One Shot" (Tin Machine song), 1991
- "One Shot" (YoungBoy Never Broke Again song), 2020
- "One Shot", by Danity Kane from Danity Kane
- "One Shot", by Hunter Hayes from Wild Blue (Part I)
- "One Shot", by Mario Vazquez from Mario Vazquez
- "One Shot", by the Newsboys from Born Again
- "One Shot", by Rob Thomas from The Great Unknown
- "One Shot", by Robin Thicke
- "One Shot", by The Saturdays from Wordshaker

== Technology and computing ==
- OneShot, a 2016 metafictional adventure video game
- One-shot learning
- One-shot learning in computer vision
- One-shot timer or one-shot, a type of digital circuit that generates a single output pulse when triggered
- Monostable multivibrator or one-shot, a type of electronic circuit that generates pulses using analog timing components

== Events ==
- One Shot (2017), a professional wrestling event
- One Shot (2023), a professional wrestling event

== See also ==
- Standalone (disambiguation)
