= Kate O'Neill =

Kate O'Neill may refer to:

- Kate Tenforde, née O'Neill, American long-distance runner
- Kate O'Neill (author), American author
