= FindFace =

Face recognition technology

- Website type: Social networking service
- Available in: Russian, English
- Owner: Ntech Lab Ltd
- Creators: Artem Kukharenko, Alexander Kabakov, Maxim Perlin
- Website: findface.pro
- Registration: Optional
- Launched: 2016; 10 years ago
- Current status: active

FindFace is a face recognition technology developed by the Russian company NtechLab that specializes in neural network tools. The company provides a line of services for the state and various business sectors based on FindFace algorithm. Previously, the technology was used as a web service that helped to find people on the VK social network using their photos.

== Technology ==
In 2015 NTechLab algorithm won The MegaFace Benchmark challenge, organized by University of Washington.

In May 2016, NtechLab was admitted to the official testing of biometrics technology by NIST among the three Russian companies. According to the results of testing, the algorithm took the first position in the ranking of the global benchmark Facial Recognition Vendor Test.

In the spring of 2017, NtechLabs algorithm again has been ranked first in the Facial Recognition Vendor Test.

Also in March 2017, NtechLabs FindFace algorithm won in the EmotionNet Challenge automatic emotion recognition competition organized by Ohio State University. 37 development teams took part in the competition, and only 2 of them were able to fulfill the conditions in full.

In the fall of 2017, NtechLab won the facial recognition technology competition organized jointly by NIST and IARPA, in two nominations out of three (“Identification Speed” and “Verification Accuracy”).

In September 2018, the NtechLab algorithm for recognizing pedestrian silhouettes won a prize in the Wider Pedestrian Challenge, a competition for detecting pedestrians and cyclists organized by Amazon and SenseTime.

FindFace employs a facial recognition neural network algorithm developed by N-Tech.Lab to match faces in the photographs uploaded by its users against faces in photographs published on VK, with a reported accuracy of 70 percent. Different sources point to NTech Lab's technology accuracy from 85.081% to 99%.

== History ==
The technology was made public as a web service that helps to find people on the social network VK using their photos in February 2016.

In May 2016 the number of visitors to the service exceeded 1 million people.

In August 2016 NtechLab co-founder Artem Kukharenko, handed over the post of head of the company to Mikhail Ivanov.

In September 2018, the service stopped providing a facility to search people's social profiles, as it was transformed by NtechLab into a line of services for various business sectors .

== Application cases ==
In 2016–2018 NtechLab presented several scenarios for using FindFace technology, which later formed the basis of the company's commercial products:

• In June 2016, the FindFace service was introduced at the Alfa Future People festival: guests of the event could identify themselves with the use of an application, and then obtain the possibility to receive their photos, taken during the event, through their social network profiles. Participation in the experiment was voluntary and did not violate the confidentiality of festival visitors.

• In 2017, NtechLab face recognition algorithms were built into the Moscow city video surveillance system operated by the Moscow Department of Information Technology . The system uses the database of the Ministry of Internal Affairs to find correspondences to it on video. The alleged use of the system is the search for criminals and the fight against terrorism.

• In February 2018, it became known that NtechLab technologies will be used in Tatarstan. As it was announced in early 2019, a pilot project in Almetyevsk showed the effectiveness of technology in ensuring public safety.

• In April 2018, it has been announced that the NtechLab face recognition algorithm will be implemented in the large Leto shopping and entertainment complex in St.Petersburg. The Leto authorities will collect a non-personal information on visitors without identifying them. The analysis will help to determine the demographic composition of customers, identify repeated visits, estimate the amount of time spent by visitors on purchases, compare customer behavior in different stores .

• In July 2018, the NtechLab application has been implemented in the water amusement park Līvu Akvaparks in Jurmala. After visiting the park, his clients were able to simplify the search for all the photographs containing their image .

• The FindFace Security application, implemented in several cities during the FIFA 2018 World Cup in Russia, made it possible to detain more than 180 people included in the offenders' bases, some of whom were on the federal wanted list .

• Thanks to the FindFace Security application, it was possible to prevent the theft of the Bud sponsorship cup as part of one of the matches of the FIFA World Cup 2018 in Russia. With the help of video cameras, it was possible to restore the chain of events and identify those involved, one of whom was discovered and detained at one of the subsequent matches.

== Developers ==
The NtechLab company that created the service was founded in 2015 by a graduate of the Moscow State University Faculty of Computational Mathematics and Cybernetics Artem Kukharenko and businessman Alexander Kabakov. In December 2021 Alexander Kabakov resigned from the board of directors of NtechLab. Artem Kukharenko also resigned from the company.

== Controversial use ==
In 2022, NTechLab was accused of assisting the Russian and Belarus government by tracking thousands of political activists which led to their unconstitutional detentions and arrests.

In 2016, FindFace generated controversy because it was once used to deanonymize Russian pornography actresses and alleged prostitutes. These efforts were organized by users of a Russian imageboard Dvach who claimed that women in the sex industry are "corrupt and deceptive", according to Global Voices. In addition, FindFace has been characterized as a major step in the erosion of anonymity.

== See also ==
- DeepFace
- FaceNet
