= One-shot learning =

One-shot learning may refer to:

- Few-shot learning, a general machine learning problem setup, of which one-shot learning is the special case where only one example per class is available
- One-shot learning (computer vision), the computer vision application of one-shot learning
