= Standalone software =

Standalone software may refer to:

- A computer program that can work offline, i.e., does not necessarily need network connection to work
- Software that is not a part of some bundled software
- A program that runs as a separate computer process, not an add-on to an extant process
- Standalone program, a program that does not need operating system services to run
- A portable application, which can be run with no need for installation procedure
- Stand-alone expansion pack, expansion packs that do not need the original game

== See also ==
- Standalone (disambiguation)
