= Stand-alone =

Standalone or Stand-alone may refer to:

- Standalone DSL, a digital subscriber line without analog telephone service; also known as naked DSL
- Stand-alone expansion pack, an expansion pack which does not require the original game in order to use the new content
- Stand-alone inverter, a power inverter that converts direct current into alternating current independent of a utility grid
- Standalone network or Intranet, a computer network that uses Internet protocol technology within an organization
- Stand-alone shell, a Unix shell designed for recovering from system failures
- Stand-alone power system, an off-the-grid electricity system
- Standalone film, a film that does not have any relation to other films
- Standalone sequel, a sequel set in the same fictional universe but having little or no reference to predecessors
- Standalone software (disambiguation)

== See also ==
- Stand Alone, a 1985 action film
- One shot (disambiguation)
- One-off (disambiguation)
