= Curriculum learning =

Technique in machine learning

Curriculum learning is a technique in machine learning in which a model is trained on examples of increasing difficulty, where the definition of "difficulty" may be provided externally or discovered as part of the training process. This is intended to attain good performance more quickly, or to converge to a better local optimum if the global optimum is not found.

== Approach ==
Most generally, curriculum learning is a technique in which the difficulty of the examples in the training set presented to a model is gradually increased over multiple training iterations. This can produce better results than exposing the model to the full training set immediately under some circumstances; most typically, when the model can learn general principles from easier examples, and then gradually incorporate more complex and nuanced information as harder examples are introduced, such as edge cases or hard negatives. This has been shown to work in many domains, most likely as a form of regularization.

There are several major variations in how the technique is applied:

- A concept of "difficulty" must be defined. This may come from human annotation or an external heuristic; for example in language modeling, shorter sentences might be classified as easier than longer ones. Another approach is to use the performance of another model, with examples accurately predicted by that model being classified as easier (providing a connection to boosting).
- Difficulty can be increased steadily or in distinct epochs, and in a deterministic schedule or according to a probability distribution. This may also be moderated by a requirement for diversity at each stage, in cases where easier examples are likely to be disproportionately similar to each other.
- Applications must also decide the schedule for increasing the difficulty. Simple approaches may use a fixed schedule, such as training on easy examples for half of the available iterations and then all examples for the second half. Other approaches use self-paced learning to increase the difficulty in proportion to the performance of the model on the current set.

Since curriculum learning only concerns the selection and ordering of training data, it can be combined with many other techniques in machine learning. The success of the method assumes that a model trained for an easier version of the problem can generalize to harder versions, so it can be seen as a form of transfer learning. Some authors also consider curriculum learning to include other forms of progressively increasing complexity, such as increasing the number of model parameters. It is frequently combined with reinforcement learning, such as learning a simplified version of a game first.

Some domains have shown success with anti-curriculum learning: training on the most difficult examples first. One example is the ACCAN method for speech recognition, which trains on the examples with the lowest signal-to-noise ratio first.

== History ==
The term "curriculum learning" was introduced by Yoshua Bengio et al in 2009, with reference to the psychological technique of shaping in animals and structured education for humans: beginning with the simplest concepts and then building on them. The authors also note that the application of this technique in machine learning has its roots in the early study of neural networks such as Jeffrey Elman's 1993 paper Learning and development in neural networks: the importance of starting small. Bengio et al showed good results for problems in image classification, such as identifying geometric shapes with progressively more complex forms, and language modeling, such as training with a gradually expanding vocabulary. They conclude that, for curriculum strategies, "their beneficial effect is most pronounced on the test set", suggesting good generalization.

The technique has since been applied to many other domains:

- Natural language processing:
  - Part-of-speech tagging
  - Intent detection
  - Sentiment analysis
  - Machine translation
  - Speech recognition
  - Language model pre-training
- Image recognition:
  - Facial recognition
  - Object detection
- Reinforcement learning:
  - Game-playing
- Graph learning
- Matrix factorization
