= One-off =

A one-off is something made or occurring only once, independent of any pattern. It may also refer to:

- One-off housing, individual houses built outside of towns and villages
- One-off vehicle, a vehicle manufactured only once
- One Off (miniseries), a video animation by Junichi Sato
- One Offs... Remixes & B-Sides, a 2002 compilation album by British musician Bonobo

== See also ==
- One and Done EP (album)
- One-shot (comics), a pilot or a stand-alone story created as a single issue rather than part of a series
- Standalone (disambiguation), something sufficient on its own or unique to itself
