= Few-shot learning =

Machine learning paradigm using minimal training data

Few-shot learning (FSL) is a problem setup in machine learning in which a model learns to perform a task, typically classification, from only a small number of labeled examples per class, rather than the large datasets required by conventional supervised learning.

One-shot learning is the special case of the N-way K-shot framing in which K equals one, such that the model must generalize from exactly one example per class.

The limiting case of few-shot learning is zero-shot learning that requires no training on examples of the class to be classified; instead, the classification task must be generalized from examples of other classes.

== Applications ==
Few-shot learning is useful in many real-life applications of artificial intelligence. It allows computers to learn new things even when only a few examples are available. For example, in image recognition, a computer can learn to identify a new object by studying a small number of pictures. In language processing, it helps AI systems understand and respond to tasks with only a few examples. It can also be helpful in healthcare, where AI models can study medical images and support the identification of diseases. This approach is useful when collecting large amounts of data is difficult or takes a lot of time.

== See also ==
- Transfer learning
- Meta-learning (computer science)
- One-shot learning (computer vision)
