= Man bites dog =

Aphorism in journalism

The phrase man bites dog is a shortened version of an aphorism in journalism that describes how an unusual, infrequent event (such as a man biting a dog) is more likely to be reported as news than an ordinary, everyday occurrence with similar consequences (such as a dog biting a man).

The phenomenon is also described in the journalistic saying, "You never read about a plane that did not crash." It can be expressed mathematically; a basic principle of information theory is that reports of unusual events provide more information than those for more routine outcomes.

== Origins ==
The phrase was coined by Alfred Harmsworth, 1st Viscount Northcliffe (1865–1922), a British newspaper magnate, but is also attributed to New York Sun editor John B. Bogart (1848–1921): "When a dog bites a man, that is not news, because it happens so often. But if a man bites a dog, that is news." The quote is also attributed to Charles Anderson Dana (1819–1897).

The result is that rarer events more often appear as news stories, while more common events appear less often, thus distorting the perceptions of news consumers of what constitutes normal rates of occurrence.

== Effect ==
To some extent, a focus on unusual occurrences is unavoidable in journalism, as events that proceed as expected are simply not "newsworthy".

The reasoning errors caused by this phenomenon are also associated with the availability heuristic, which is the mental shortcut that relies on the immediate examples that come to mind when evaluating a specific topic. For example, because airplane crashes are frequently reported, they are easy to call to mind. This leads to people having inaccurate perceptions of how dangerous air travel is.

Some consider "man bites dog" stories about unusual events a sign of yellow journalism, and in the internet era, headlines about them may be phrased as click bait.

=== Mathematical analysis ===
A basic principle of the information theory, which studies the mathematical theory of communication, is that reports of unusual events provide more information than those for more routine outcomes. The amount of information conveyed by a message about an event can be expressed in terms of its "surprisal", with surprisal $s$ defined as $s = -log(p)$ for an event of probability $p$. Measured this way, an event that is nearly certain to happen ($p$ very close to one) carries almost no information, while an extremely rare event ($p$ very close to zero) provides a very large amount of information.

== Examples of literal use in journalism ==
In 2000, the Santa Cruz Sentinel ran a story titled "Man bites dog" about a San Francisco man who bit his own dog.

Reuters ran a story, "It's News! Man Bites Dog", about a man biting a dog in December 2007.

A 2008 story of a boy biting a dog in Brazil had news outlets quoting the phrase.

In 2010, NBC Connecticut ran a story about a man who bit a police dog, prefacing it with, "It's often said, if a dog bites a man it's not news, but if a man bites a dog, you've got a story. Well, here is that story."

In 2012 there were at least three instances: On May 14, the Medway Messenger, a British local newspaper, ran a front page story headlined "MAN BITES DOG" about a man who survived an attack from a Staffordshire bull terrier by biting the dog back. On September 27, the Toronto Star, a Canadian newspaper, ran the story headlined "Nearly Naked Man Bites Dog", about a man that is alleged to have bitten a dog in Pembroke, Ontario. And on December 2, Sydney Morning Herald reported about a man that bit a dog, headlining it 'Man bites Dog, goes to hospital'.

On May 5, 2013, "Nine News", an Australian news outlet, ran a story headlined "Man bites dog to save wife" about a man who bit a Labrador on the nose, after it attacked his wife and bit off her nose.

There were at least five instances of the headline in 2014: On March 12, Rosbalt, a Russian news agency, reported that a man in Lipetsk had burnt a bed in his apartment, run around the city in his underwear, and, finally, "bit a fighting breed dog" following an hours-long online debate about the situation in Ukraine. In April, CNN reported a mother bit a pit bull attacking her daughter. On June 14, the South Wales Argus ran a front page teaser headlined "Man Bites Dog" about a man who has been accused of assaulting his partner and her pet dog. The Online version of this story was later amended to "Man bites dog and escapes jail". On September 1, the Coventry Telegraph and the Daily Mirror ran an article about a man who had bitten a dog after it attacked his pet. And on December 17, the Cambridge News ran an article with a headline starting: "Man bites dog then dies".

On November 4, 2015, the Washington Post ran an article with the title "Man bites dog. No, really."

In 2018 there were at least three instances: On January 25, The Hindu reported that a man bit a police dog in Houston, Texas, while trying to evade arrest. On April 10, the Daily Telegraph ran such an article about a man biting a dog to defend his own dog. And on May 4, the Salt Lake Tribune ran an article about a man biting a police dog while being taken into custody.

On July 8, 2019, the Daily Camera ran an article about a man biting a dog in a supermarket.

On April 22, 2022, the Associated Press ran an article about a man who bit a police dog while officers tried to take him into custody.

== Dog shoots man ==
There have also been a number of "dog shoots man" news stories.

As an example of a related phrase, a story titled "Deer Shoots Hunter" appeared in a 1947 issue of the Pittsburgh Press, mentioning a hunter that was shot by his own gun due to a reflex kick by the deer he had killed. And in 2005, in Michigan, there was a case of "cat shoots man".

== Man bites snake ==
On April 12, 2009, Kenyan farm worker Ben Nyaumbe was attacked by a large python. During his struggle to escape from the snake's coils, he bit its tail. He was rescued after it eventually relaxed its grasp enough for him to get to his mobile phone.
