= Kate O'Neill (author) =

American author and tech consultant

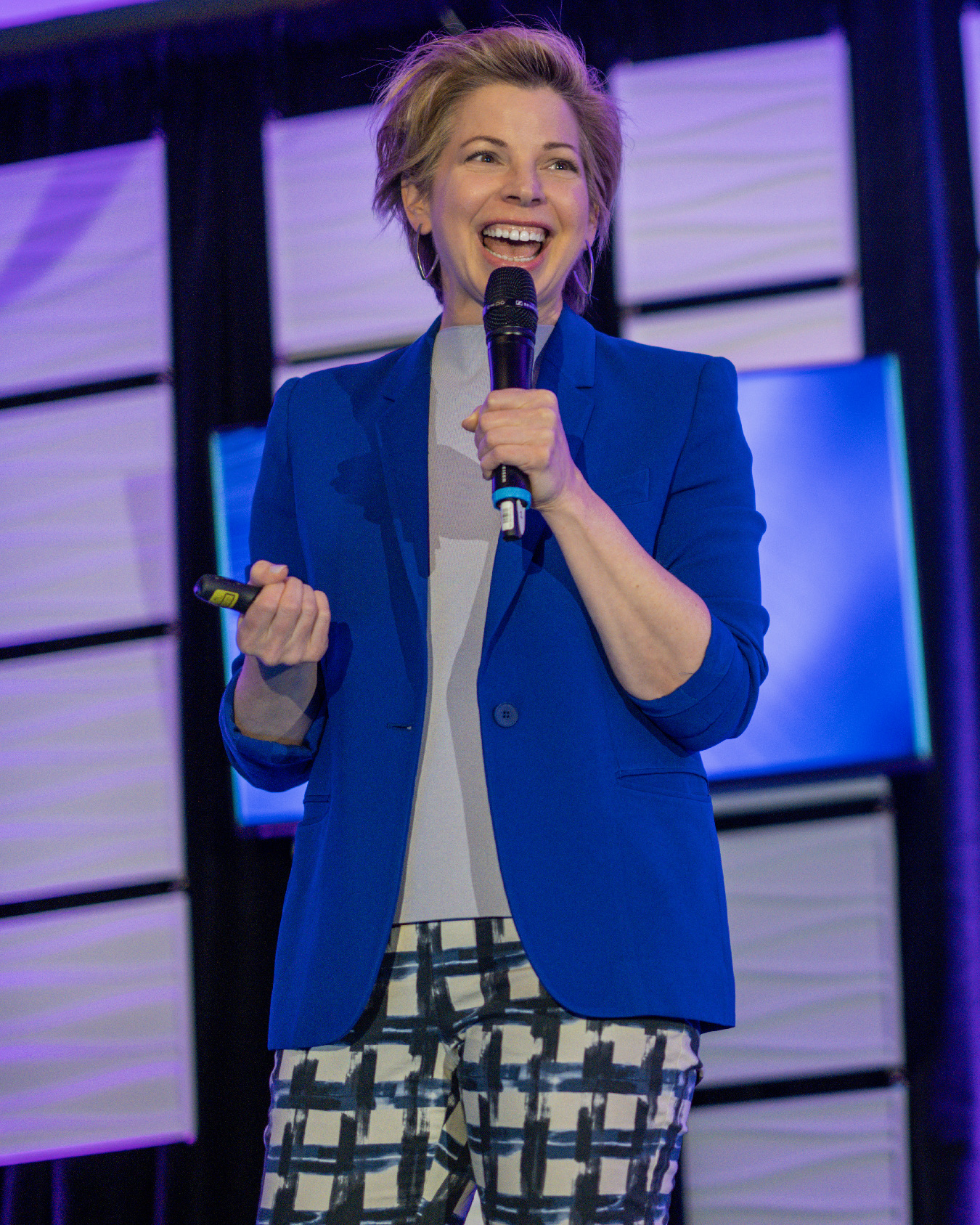
- Born: Park Forest, Illinois, Illinois, U.S.
- Occupations: Author; speaker; consultant; entrepreneur

Kate O'Neill is an American author, tech consultant, and one of Netflix's first 100 employees. She is the founder of a tech-consulting firm KO Insights and host of The Tech Humanist Show. O'Neill is a Wired contributing writer and a regular speaker for companies within Silicon Valley. She is recognized by Thinkers50 as one of the top 50 management thinkers in the world.

In 2018, O'Neill published her third book,"Tech Humanist: How You Can Make Technology Better for Business and Better for Humans." The following year, O'Neill wrote an article on Wired about the 10-Year-Challenge Meme that went viral on Facebook, where people shared photos comparing their then-and-now photographs.

In 2021, O'Neill published "A Future So Bright: How Strategic Optimism and Meaningful Innovation Can Restore Our Humanity and Save the World." In 2023 it was shortlisted for the Thinkers50 Distinguished Achievement Award in Digital Thinking.

In 2025, O'Neill published "What Matters Next: A Leaders Guide to Making Human-Friendly Tech Decisions in a World That's Moving Too Fast" (Wiley). It was named to the Thinkers50 2025 Best New Management Booklist and shortlisted for the Thinkers50 Distinguished Achievement Award in Digital Thinking. It was also longlisted for the 2025 Porchlight Business Book Awards

In November 2025, O'Neill was named to the Thinkers50, a global ranking of the top 50 management thinkers.

Since 2015 she has lived in New York City.
