= Outline of computer vision =

Overview of and topical guide to computer vision

The following outline is provided as an overview of and topical guide to computer vision:

Computer vision – interdisciplinary field that deals with how computers can be made to gain high-level understanding from digital images or videos. From the perspective of engineering, it seeks to automate tasks that the human visual system can do. Computer vision tasks include methods for acquiring digital images (through image sensors), image processing, and image analysis, to reach an understanding of digital images. In general, it deals with the extraction of high-dimensional data from the real world in order to produce numerical or symbolic information that the computer can interpret. The image data can take many forms, such as video sequences, views from multiple cameras, or multi-dimensional data from a medical scanner. As a technological discipline, computer vision seeks to apply its theories and models for the construction of computer vision systems. As a scientific discipline, computer vision is concerned with the theory behind artificial systems that extract information from images.

== Branches of computer vision ==
- Computer stereo vision
- Underwater computer vision

== History of computer vision ==
History of computer vision

== Computer vision subsystems ==
=== Image enhancement ===
- Image denoising
- Image histogram
- Inpainting
- Super-resolution imaging
- Histogram equalization
- Tone mapping
- Retinex
- Gamma correction
- Anisotropic diffusion (Perona–Malik equation)

=== Transformations ===
- Affine transform
- Homography (computer vision)
- Hough transform
- Radon transform
- Walsh–Hadamard transform

=== Filtering, Fourier and wavelet transforms and image compression ===
- Image compression
- Filter bank
- Gabor filter
- JPEG 2000
- Adaptive filtering

=== Color vision ===
- Visual perception
- Human visual system model
- Color matching function
- Color space
- Color appearance model
- Color management system
- Color mapping
- Color model
- Color profile

=== Feature extraction ===
- Active contour
- Blob detection
- Canny edge detector
- Contour detection
- Edge detection
- Edge linking
- Harris Corner Detector
- Histogram of oriented gradients (HOG)
- Random sample consensus (RANSAC)
- Scale-invariant feature transform (SIFT)

=== Pose estimation ===
- Bundle adjustment
- Articulated body pose estimation (BoPoE)
- Direct linear transformation (DLT)
- Epipolar geometry
- Fundamental matrix
- Pinhole camera model
- Projective geometry
- Trifocal tensor

=== Registration ===
- Active appearance model (AAM)
- Cross-correlation
- Geometric hashing
- Graph cut segmentation
- Least squares estimation
- Image pyramid
- Image segmentation
- Level-set method
- Markov random fields
- Medial axis
- Motion field
- Motion vector
- Multispectral imaging
- Normalized cut segmentation
- Optical flow
- Particle filtering
- Scale space

=== Visual recognition ===
- Object recognition
- Scale-invariant feature transform (SIFT)
- Gesture recognition
- Bag-of-words model in computer vision
- Kadir–Brady saliency detector
- Eigenface

== Commercial computer vision systems ==
- 5DX
- Aphelion (software)
- Microsoft PixelSense
- Poseidon drowning detection system
- Roboflow
- Visage SDK

== Applications ==
- 3D reconstruction from multiple images
- Audio-visual speech recognition
- Augmented reality
- Augmented reality-assisted surgery
- Automated optical inspection
- Automatic image annotation
- Automatic number plate recognition
- Automatic target recognition
- Check weigher
- Closed-circuit television
- Computer stereo vision
- Contextual image classification
- DARPA LAGR Program
- Digital video fingerprinting
- Document mosaicing
- Facial recognition systems
- GazoPa
- Geometric feature learning
- Gesture recognition
- Image collection exploration
- Image retrieval
  - Content-based image retrieval
  - Reverse image search
- Image-based modeling and rendering
- Integrated mail processing
- Iris recognition
- Machine vision
- Mobile mapping
- Navigation system components for:
  - Autonomous cars
  - Mobile robots
- Object detection
- Optical braille recognition
- Optical character recognition
  - Intelligent character recognition
- Pedestrian detection
- People counter
- Physical computing
- Red light camera
- Remote sensing
- Smart camera
- Traffic enforcement camera
- Traffic sign recognition
- Vehicle infrastructure integration
- Velocity Moments
- Video content analysis
- View synthesis
- Visual sensor network
- Visual Word
- Water remote sensing

== Computer vision companies ==
- 3DFLOW
- Automatix
- Clarifai
- Cognex Corporation
- Datagen
- Diffbot
- IBM
- InspecVision
- Isra Vision
- Kinesense
- Mobileye
- Roboflow
- Scantron Corporation
- Teledyne DALSA
- VIEW Engineering
- Warden Machinery
- Zivid

== Computer vision publications ==
- Electronic Letters on Computer Vision and Image Analysis
- International Journal of Computer Vision

== Computer vision organizations ==
- Conference on Computer Vision and Pattern Recognition
- European Conference on Computer Vision
- International Conference on Computer Vision
- International Conferences in Central Europe on Computer Graphics, Visualization and Computer Vision

== See also ==
- Outline of artificial intelligence
- Outline of deep learning
- Outline of robotics
- List of computer graphics and descriptive geometry topics
- Virtual Design and Construction
