= Hugh H. Young =

American urologist (1870–1945)

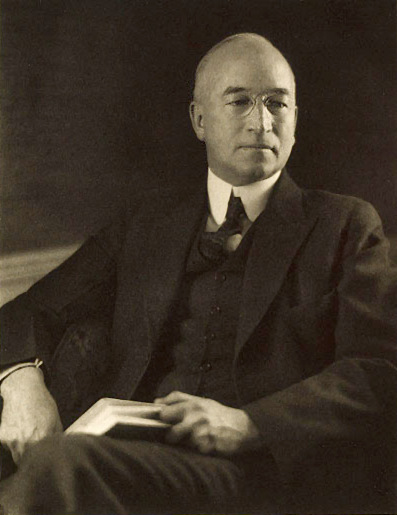
- Hugh Hampton Young, published in A book of Portraits, Johns Hopkins, 1922
- Born: Hugh Hampton Young; September 18, 1870; San Antonio, Texas, U.S.
- Died: August 23, 1945 (aged 74); Baltimore, Maryland, U.S.
- Education: University of Virginia (BA, MA); University of Virginia School of Medicine (MD)

Signature
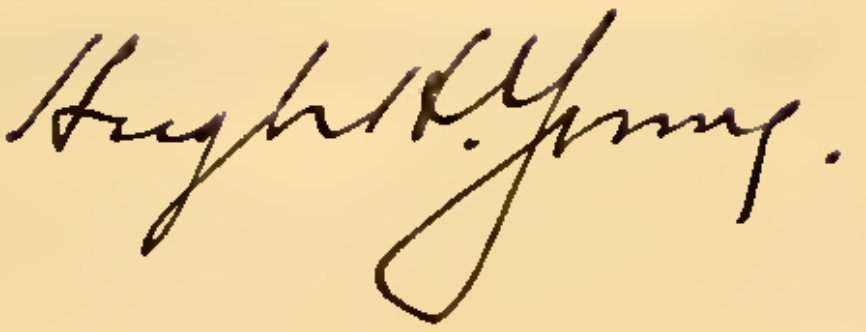

Hugh Hampton Young (September 18, 1870 – August 23, 1945) was a prominent American surgeon, urologist, and medical researcher.

== Biography ==
Young was born in San Antonio, Texas, on September 18, 1870, the son of Confederate Brigadier General William Hugh Young and Frances Michie (née Kemper) Young.

He graduated from the University of Virginia in 1891, acquiring in just four years not only B.A., M.A. degrees, but an M.D. as well. He then returned home to San Antonio to start a medical practice. In 1895, believing he needed more training, Young came to Baltimore to undertake postgraduate work at the Johns Hopkins University School of Medicine, and, soon thereafter, was teaching there. By 1897 he was the head of their urology department at the young age of 27. The Brady Urological Institute, named after one of Young's patients, Diamond Jim Brady, opened at Johns Hopkins in 1915. Young remained at the institute for most of his life, until 1940.

Among Young's contributions to the medical field are several inventions and discoveries, primarily relating to surgery. One such innovation was the "boomerang needle," a type of surgical needle designed for working with deep incisions. He also invented a device known as the Young punch, an instrument used in prostatectomy procedures. He and his associates also developed the antiseptic merbromin, more popularly known as Mercurochrome, one of its brand names.

Intersex people were brought to Brady Urological Institute to reassign them as either male or female, and the Institute's protocol, created under Young, was widely influential. Young began with external and internal exams, X-rays, and exploratory surgery. Intersex children in the 1920s and 1930s typically went to Brady rather than to the pediatric Harriet Lane Home at Hopkins.

He is credited with conceiving of the use of radical perineal prostatectomy to treat prostate cancer and performed the first operation of that kind on April 7, 1904. He learned the procedure from Dr. George Goodfellow, who first performed the operation in 1891. Goodfellow's original purpose was to treat bladder problems caused by an enlarged prostate. Goodfellow traveled extensively across the United States for several years training other physicians in the operation, including Dr. Young. Goodfellow completed 78 operations and only two patients died, a remarkable level of success for the time period.

In World War I, Young was a Major in charge of the venereal health of the Doughboys in France. He fought prostitution near American bases with the full cooperation of General Pershing. In 1917, he established The Journal of Urology and became its first editor-in-chief.

In addition to his pioneering medical work, Young had a personal interest in the burgeoning field of aviation and chaired a committee for planning what is now Baltimore-Washington International Airport, which at the time was to be named "Friendship Airport." He was also active in community affairs and was known to be a supporter of Albert Cabell Ritchie, a Maryland politician who made a bid for the presidency in 1932 but lost the nomination to Franklin Delano Roosevelt at the Democratic Party convention in Chicago, where Young was among the delegates.

Young wrote an autobiography entitled Hugh Young, a surgeon's autobiography (published by Harcourt, Brace and company in 1940) as well as several urological texts. He died on August 23, 1945, and is buried in Druid Ridge Cemetery, in Baltimore, Maryland.

The American Urological Association presents an annual award called the Hugh Hampton Young Award named in his honor. Notable recipients include John K. Lattimer, pioneer of pediatric urology and physician investigator of the JFK assassination, and Larry I. Lipshultz, founder of Society for the Study of Male Reproduction.

The Hugh Hampton Young Memorial Fellowship at the Massachusetts Institute of Technology was established by an anonymous donor in 1965, for the benefit of MIT graduate students; it "seeks individuals exhibiting a blend of broad focus, leadership, and initiative," and recognizes "academic achievement across multiple disciplines and [honors] students who possess exceptional character strengths. These students harbor outstanding potential to make a positive impact on humanity."

== Selected publications ==
- Young, Hugh Hampton (December 1909). "XV. Cancer of the Prostate". Annals of Surgery. 50 (6): 1144–1233. doi:10.1097/00000658-190912000-00015. ISSN 0003-4932. PMC 1407492. PMID 17862456.

== Bibliography ==
- Young, Hugh (1940). Hugh Young: a Surgeon's Autobiography. New York: Harcourt, Brace and Company. OCLC 1311206.
