= Lidar (disambiguation) =

Lidar is a method of spatial measurement using laser.

Lidar may also refer to:

- Daniel Lidar (born 1968), American engineer and academic
- Lidar, character from Tomes & Talismans

== See also ==
- Liddar River
