= Augmented reality-assisted surgery =

Augmented reality-assisted surgery (ARAS) is a surgical tool utilizing technology that superimposes a computer-generated image on a surgeon's view of the operative field, thus providing a composite view for the surgeon of the patient with a computer generated overlay enhancing the operative experience. In addition, augmented reality interfaces (ARI) with ARAS allow for non-physical contact by recognizing speech from surgeons and lowering the chances of physical contamination while operating. ARAS can be used for training, preparation for an operation, or performance of an operation. Surgeons are a great way in which these procedures are implemented into medicine. ARAS can be performed using a wide array of technology, including an optical head-mounted display (OHMD)—such as the Google Glass XE 22.1 or Vuzix STAR 1200 XL. A study recorded a relatively positive reaction among trainees towards this technology in the operation room as the ARAS device guided them through a procedure. Some ARAS devices also provide a digital overlay from robotic and laparoscopic surgery feeds. Augmented reality assisted surgery devices have been growing in use in various medical fields such as imagining, interactive body mapping, and modeling possible cancerous growths. It is also being used as a way to plan before executing a complicated surgery. This technology has some specialized uses in urological and cardiovascular areas.

== Specialized uses ==
A subset of called augmented reality-assisted urologic surgery (ARAUS) specifically aids with urological surgery. This intraoperative training tool was first described and utilized by Tariq S. Hakky, Ryan M. Dickey, and Larry I. Lipshultz within the Scott Department of Urology, Baylor College of Medicine, and Daniel R. Martinez, Rafael E. Carrion, and Philippe E. Spiess within the Sexual Medicine Program in the Department of Urology, at the University of South Florida. It was initially used to teach medical residents how to place a penile implant from start to finish via an application downloaded onto the OHMD. Intraoperatively, an optical display camera output feed combined with software allowing for the detection of points of interest enabled faculty to interact with residents during the placement of the penile implant. Both faculty and residents demonstrated a high degree of satisfaction of the ARAUS experience, and it was shown to be an effective tool in training urological surgical technique. Advantages of ARAUS include real-time feedback of residents during suy and superior visibility and interaction between faculty and residents.

ARAS has also been applied to the cardiovascular realm. Terry Peters of the University of Western Ontario in London, Canada has teamed up with other researchers at the Robarts Research Institute to implement ARAS towards the goal of improving repairs to the heart's mitral valve and replacement of the aortic valve. In an interview for the Medical Augmented Reality Blog, Peters stated that his research team could not only use ARAS to "[improve] the speed and safety of the cardiac valve repair procedure"; they also conducted "the evaluation of an AR environment to plan brain-tumor removal, and the development of an ARF-enhanced system for ultrasound-guided spinal injections."

Holosurical Inc has developed the clinically tested ARAI™ surgical navigation system that provides real-time patient-specific 3D anatomical visualization for presurgical planning, intraoperative guidance, and postsurgical data analytics. The augmented reality component of the system allows the surgeon to focus their attention on the patient's internal anatomy, without actually exposing it. On January 10, 2019, HoloSurgical Inc completed the 1st spine surgery in the world using augmented reality, artificial intelligence-based navigation system. The system was developed by AI pioneer Pawel Lewicki PhD, surgeon Kris Siemionow MD, PhD, and engineer Cristian Luciano PhD.
