= 3DF Zephyr =

Photogrammetry and 3D modeling software

- Developer(s): 3DFLOW
- Initial release: January 2014; 11 years ago
- Stable release: 8.005 / February 2025; 3 months ago
- Operating system: Windows
- Available in: English, Italian, Spanish, German, Chinese, French, Turkish, Japanese and Korean
- Type: Photogrammetry
- License: Proprietary
- Website: www.3dflow.net

3DF Zephyr is a commercial photogrammetry and 3D modeling software. Developed and marketed by the Italian software house 3DFLOW, 3DF Zephyr was first released in January 2014 and continuously updated since then. It's a complete photogrammetry pipeline software package that includes many post processing tools for post processing, measurements, 3D modeling and content creation. It allows 3D reconstruction from both photos or videos, by automatically extracting frames and selecting those most suitable for the computation.

Although the software is a Windows only application, it has been reported as fully working on Linux with the aid of Wine.

== History ==
The technology behind 3DF Zephyr has been completely in-house built by 3DFLOW, rather than relying on computer vision third party libraries like most of its competitors. Initially released as 3DF Zephyr Pro, a consumer-targeted edition was released shortly, 3DF Zephyr Lite and then a GIS and mapping oriented edition as well, 3DF Zephyr Aerial. In 2017, 3DFLOW also released a free edition, which allows the processing of up to 50 images. Since 5.0 however, the Pro and Aerial edition were discontinued and merged into a new full version (called 3DF Zephyr), while maintaining 3DF Zephyr Lite and 3DF Zephyr Free as separate packages.

The technology behind 3DF Zephyr is also academically traceable, as it can be found cited in more than 100 papers.

3DF Zephyr has been one of the first photogrammetry software tailored also for hobbyists and enthusiasts: it's the first photogrammetry software to be ever published on Steam and one of the few fully featured photogrammetry software packages available for free.

All the 3DF Zephyr packages share the same proprietary reconstruction engine from 3DFLOW and bundle the automatic image masking software 3DF Masquerade, while the complete edition 3DF Zephyr bundles 3DF Scarlet which is a dedicated software for laser scan registration.

== See also ==
- Photogrammetry
- Computer vision
- Comparison of photogrammetry software
