= Elastic matching =

Pattern recognition technique

Elastic matching is one of the pattern recognition techniques in computer science. Elastic matching (EM) is also known as deformable template, flexible matching, or nonlinear template matching.

Elastic matching can be defined as an optimization problem of two-dimensional warping specifying corresponding pixels between subjected images.

== See also ==
- Dynamic time warping
- Graphical time warping
