= Tomes & Talismans =

Educational television series produced by Mississippi Public Broadcasting

- Genre: Children's television series Science fiction Reading education
- No. of seasons: 1
- No. of episodes: 13

Production
- Production company: Mississippi Public Broadcasting

Original release
- Release: 1986 – 1986

Tomes & Talismans is a 1986 educational television series produced by Mississippi Public Broadcasting, consisting of thirteen 20-minute episodes presented as a dramatic serial story. Each episode defines, illustrates, and reviews specific library research concepts.

== Plot ==
In the late 21st Century, Earth is overcrowded and polluted. An alien race from the Dark Star solar system called "The Wipers," who look human, start to colonize the planet and go about destroying communication and data technology. In 2117, humans start to evacuate the planet for a place called the White Crystal solar system. In 2123, the last of the humans are getting ready to evacuate. Meanwhile, a group of librarians, led by Ms. Bookhart, have built an underground library to protect all human knowledge from the Wipers. While they are finishing up before they leave for the evacuation site, they discover that one book, the third volume of The History of the Wipers on Earth, is missing. Desperate to find that book, Ms. Bookhart drives the bookmobile to the house of the last person who borrowed that book to see if he forgot to return it. When she arrives, she discovers a Wiper is there destroying everything. On her way to the evacuation site the bookmobile stalls. As she is looking for tools to fix the vehicle, a being who calls himself "The Universal Being" appears and puts her into a deep sleep. The other librarians go to the evacuation site and are sad to leave without Ms. Bookhart, not knowing what happened to her or the missing book.

100 years later, another alien race called "The Users" from the Alpha Centauri solar system, who also look human, have set up a communication base on Earth. Under the guidance of the Users' leader, Tesla, a group of User children try to learn about human knowledge as much as possible in order to find a way to defeat the Wipers. Two Users named Abakas and Aphos, who are Tesla's grandchildren, find two books, Cinderella and the third volume of The History of the Wipers on Earth, and try to figure out their purpose. Meanwhile, two other Users find a sign that says "Bookmobile Stops Here." When they learn a bookmobile is a traveling library, which has many books, Abakas and Aphose along with two other friends, Varian and Lidar, leave the base and search for the bookmobile in order to get more books. When they find it, they are surprised to find Ms. Bookhart inside asleep, since it is known that all humans left the planet. The Universal Being appears again and gives them a clue on how to wake Ms. Bookhart, who will teach them about the books and how to use the library. Figuring out one part of the clue, Abakas starts to read a section of The Story of the Amulet, which wakes up Ms. Bookhart. She then takes the children to the underground library to hide from the Wipers, only to discover it's a wreck. While the children are helping her clean up, she teaches them more about books and how the library is organized.

Meanwhile, the Wipers, led by Chief Humbuckler, put a magnetic shield around the User base, which prevents anyone from entering or leaving. They destroy other User bases, but only Colonel Holon, Abakas' and Aphos' father, survives. While the children are learning about the library, they find ways to help Colonel Holon survive by eating watermelon, find his way to the library, destroy the shield around the base, Wiper superstition about horses, and how to defeat the Wipers and communicate with the humans that it is safe to come home.

== Episodes ==
Each episode teaches certain things about books and how to use a library as the story unfolds.

Episode	Title	Lesson
1.	Tomes Entombed	Overview of a Library
2.	Fact or Fiction	Categories of books; Fiction, Nonfiction, and Biography
3.	Under Cover	Sections of a book; Cover, Title page, Copyright page, Table of Contents, Foreword, Preface, Index, Glossary, and Bibliography
4.	In the Cards	Finding a certain book through the card catalog based on Title, Subject, or Author of the book
5.	The System	Grouping books based on the Dewey Decimal system
6.	Information Quick	Finding information through the Encyclopedia
7.	Hidden Meaning	Learning the meaning of a word though the Dictionary and Thesaurus
8.	Preference for Reference	Looking up a specific subject through Reference books
9.	Direction Unknown	Finding locations through Maps and Almanacs
10.	SOS: Skim or Scan	Speed reading by skimming and scanning a book
11.	Guide to Light	Finding recent information through Periodicals; Magazines and Newspapers
12.	Show and Tell	Audiovisual information: Films and Videotapes
13.	Final Report	Finalizing everything researched

== Cast and characters ==
- Brian Ward as the Universal Being
- Jackie Lett as Earth Descendant

Librarians

- Niki Wood as Ms. Bookhart - Head Librarian
- Denise Halbach as Dundee
- Michael Stewart as Lester
- Shari Schneider as Margaret

Users

- Joan Stebe as Tesla - Leader of the Users
- Cresta Martin as Abakas - Tesla's granddaughter
- Darin Hyer as Aphos - Tesla's grandson and Abakas' older brother
- Mia Trevillion as Varian
- Jamie Martin as Lidar
- Traber Burns as Colonel Holon - Abakas' and Aphos' father
- Nick Stebe as Pixel
- John Horhn as Reset
- Charles Sampson as Chroma
- Mondria Jackson
- Linda Martin
- Osborne Moyer
- Jason Pace
- Fredericka Sands
- Steven Sprayberry
- Danyella Tedford
- Maurine Twiss

Wipers

- Mac McMillin as Chief Humbuckler - Leader of the Wipers
- Russ Swain as Ferrite - Humbuckler's right-hand man
- W.C. McMullin as the Platoon Commander
- Mary Holden as Grimick
- Jim Robinson as Bumfig
- B.J Lambert as Mrs. Humbuckler
- Dianne Brown
- Jamie Ware
- Kerry Yoder
- Walley Wooten
- Patricia Gougne

== See also ==
- Read All About It!, 1979–81 educational sci-fi series
- Dewey Decimal Classification
- Library classification
