= 3DFLOW =

Italian software house

3DFlow, srl
- Company type: Private
- Industry: Computer software
- Founded: Verona (2011)
- Headquarters: Udine, Udine, Italy
- Website: www.3dflow.net

3DFlow, srl is an Italian software house operating in the field of Computer Vision and Image Processing. It was established in 2011 as a spin-off of the University of Verona and in 2012 it became a spin-off of the University of Udine.

Most known for its photogrammetry software 3DF Zephyr that allows the user to automatically create 3D models starting with a random set of pictures, 3DFlow is also involved as a consulting company with other well known software house such as Activision and Quantel. Part of its technology has been made available for free such as 3DF Samantha and JLinkage which overall have been cited on more than 50 papers.

== Products ==
- 3DF Zephyr
- 3DF Masquerade
- 3DF Samantha
- 3DF Stasia
- 3DF Sasha
- 3DF Lapyx

== See also ==
- 3D data acquisition and object reconstruction
- Photogrammetry
