= Roboflow =

Software development company

- Founded: 2019
- Founders: Brad Dwyer, Joseph Nelson
- Headquarters: Des Moines, Iowa
- Website: roboflow.com

Roboflow is a software development company that develops computer vision products.

== History ==
Roboflow was founded in 2019 by Brad Dwyer and Joseph Nelson. Prior to Roboflow, both had worked on augmented reality and artificial intelligence apps. The first version of Roboflow was launched in 2020 as a platform for the management of image datasets. It later moved to model training and model deployment. Initial uses including medical research and smart city applications. As of 2024, it has raised $63.4M in funding and been used by over one million developers.

== Platform ==
Roboflow is a software platform that allows developers to build computer vision into products. Developers can upload images and videos which are then used to train computer vision models. It also has an open source repository with over 500,000 labelled data sets and 500 million images as of 2024.
