= Optical braille recognition =

Automated recognition of braille characters

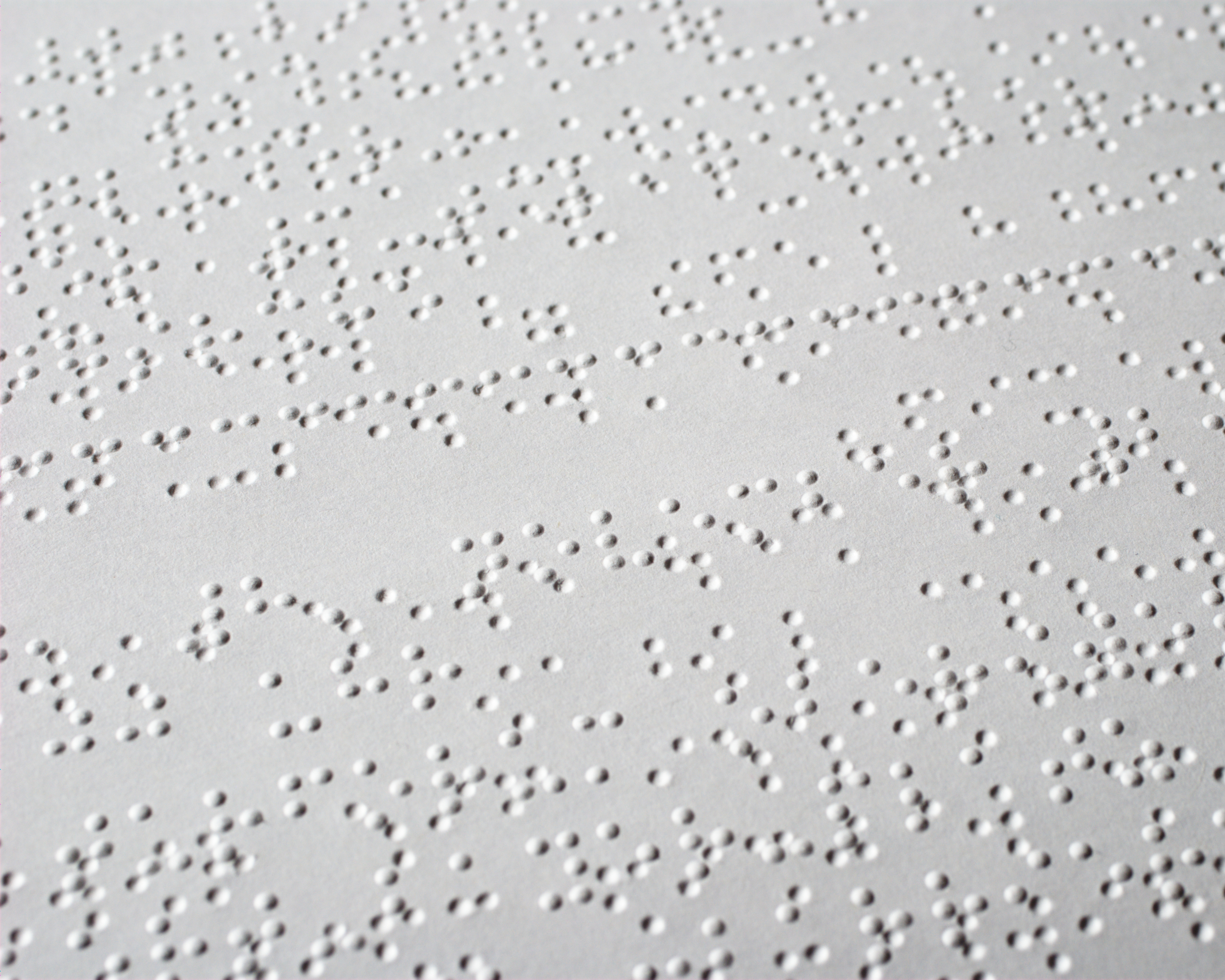
Image of a page showing both the raised braille characters, and the recessed characters on the other side of the page.

Optical braille recognition is technology to capture and process images of braille characters into natural language characters. It is used to convert braille documents for people who cannot read them into text, and for preservation and reproduction of the documents.

== History ==
In 1984, a group of researchers at the Delft University of Technology designed a braille reading tablet, in which a reading head with photosensitive cells was moved along set of rulers to capture braille text line-by-line. In 1988, a group of French researchers at the Lille University of Science and Technology developed an algorithm, called Lectobraille, which converted braille documents into plain text. The system photographed the braille text with a low-resolution CCD camera, and used spatial filtering techniques, median filtering, erosion, and dilation to extract the braille. The braille characters were then converted to natural language using adaptive recognition. The Lectobraille technique had an error rate of 1%, and took an average processing time of seven seconds per line. In 1993, a group of researchers from the Katholieke Universiteit Leuven developed a system to recognize braille that had been scanned with a commercially available scanner. The system, however, was unable to handle deformities in the braille grid, so well-formed braille documents were required. In 1999, a group at the Hong Kong Polytechnic University implemented an optical braille recognition technique using edge detection to translate braille into English or Chinese text. In 2001, Murray and Dais created a handheld recognition system, that scanned small sections of a document at once. Because of the small area scanned at once, grid deformation was less of an issue, and a simpler, more efficient algorithm was employed. In 2003, Morgavi and Morando designed a system to recognize braille characters using artificial neural networks. This system was noted for its ability to handle image degradation more successfully than other approaches.

== Challenges ==
Many of the challenges to successfully processing braille text arise from the nature of braille documents. Braille is generally printed on solid-color paper, with no ink to produce contrast between the raised characters and the background paper. However, imperfections in the page can appear in a scan or image of the page.

Many documents are printed inter-point, meaning they are double-sided. As such, the depressions of the braille of one side appear interlaid with the protruding braille of the other side.

== Techniques ==
Some optical braille recognition techniques attempt to use oblique lighting and a camera to reveal the shadows of the depressions and protrusions of the braille. Others make use of commercially available document scanners.

== See also ==
- Optical character recognition
