= Larry Lipshultz =

American urologist

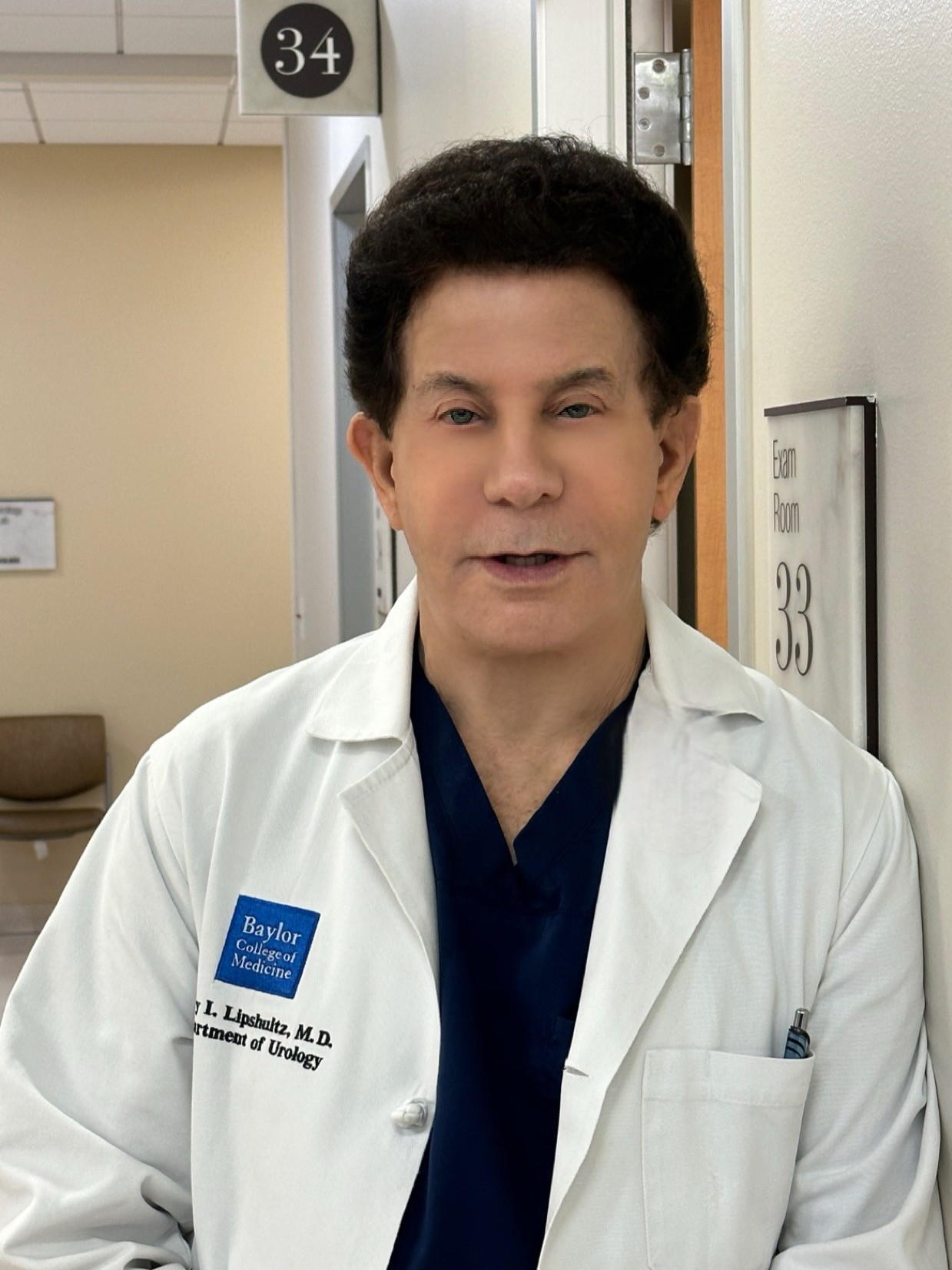
- Education: Franklin and Marshall College (B.S.); University of Pennsylvania (M.D.)
- Occupation: Surgeon
- Website: https://www.larrylipshultz.com

Larry I. Lipshultz is an American urologist, surgeon, researcher, and teacher. He currently serves as Professor of Urology, Lester and Sue Smith Endowed Chair in Reproductive Medicine, and Chief of the Scott Department of Urology's Division of Male Reproductive Medicine and Surgery at Baylor College of Medicine, Houston, Texas.

Lipshultz is known for his work in Men's Health. He founded the Society for the Study of Male Reproduction and was president of the American Society for Reproductive Medicine. In addition to his practice, Lipshultz established the first fellowship in Male Reproductive Medicine and Surgery and has trained over 120 fellows who are now practicing throughout the United States and abroad.

== Early life and education ==
Lipshultz was born in Philadelphia, Pennsylvania. He attended Franklin and Marshall College in Lancaster, Pennsylvania, for his undergraduate degree. Lipshultz graduated Magna Cum Laude with Honors in Biology and Mathematics and joined Phi Beta Kappa.

During the summer as an undergraduate, Lipshultz worked at the University of Pennsylvania in the Harrison Department of Surgical Research. He was assigned to work for a urologist named Joseph Corriere, who introduced him to this surgical subspecialty for the first time. Corriere mentored Lipshultz, leading him to pursue urology for his medical career.

Lipshultz received his medical degree from the University of Pennsylvania in Philadelphia, Pennsylvania, where he continued to complete his residency in urology. While rotating in OB/GYN during a Grand Round, Lipshultz was introduced to the idea of Male Reproductive Medicine. During his residency’s research year, he spent his time furthering his education in male infertility, leading him to dedicate his career to this field. Lipshultz was named the first American Urological Association (AUA) Research Scholar, allowing him to complete a two-year Fellowship under Emil Steinberger, an endocrinologist specializing in Reproductive Medicine at The University of Texas Houston Health Science Center, and Jim Norris, a specialist in cell cultures of Baylor College of Medicine. Consequently, this research brought Lipshultz to Houston, Texas, where he has continued to practice medicine.

== Medical specialization and research ==
=== Medical Practice ===
Lipshultz is a urologist specializing in Male Reproductive Medicine and Surgery at Baylor College of Medicine. He has exclusively practiced at the Texas Medical Center, the largest medical center in the world.

His professional interests include vasectomy reversals, vasectomies, male infertility, erectile dysfunction, low testosterone, Peyronie's disease, sexual wellness, and male reproductive medicine. He is licensed to practice medicine in Texas.

Lipshultz pioneered microscopic surgeries such as vasovasostomy, epididymovasostomy, testicular sperm extraction procedures (TESA, TESE, and mTESE), and was a leading figure in early transgender surgeries in Texas.

=== Military career ===
Lipshultz was called to serve as a urologist at William Beaumont General Hospital in El Paso, Texas, by the United States Army during his residency. He started a semen analysis laboratory in the hospital and continued to see infertility patients. For his outstanding performance, initiative of increasing the scope of the male fertility clinic, and personal interest in the care of his patients, Lipshultz earned a Certificate of Achievement in June 1973 from the William Beaumont Army Medical Center in El Paso, Texas. Lipshultz returned to Pennsylvania to complete his residency following his service. He served two years as a Major and was honorably discharged in March 1974.

=== Research ===
Lipshultz has done research on Male Reproductive Medicine, including Peyronie's disease, hypogonadism, and microsurgery. He has published over 450 peer-reviewed manuscripts. He was founder of the Society for the Study of Male Reproduction (SSMR) and served as president from 1994-1995. In addition, Lipshultz was president of the American Society for Reproductive Medicine from 1999 to 2000.

Lipshultz has been invited to 10 international and over 220 national conferences, acting as a speaker, moderator, panelist, or course director. Lipshultz was the Bruce Stewart Memorial Lecturer at the 2019 American Society for Reproductive Medicine Scientific Congress and Expo and was the keynote speaker at the Chicago Urological Society Annual Meeting in 2020.

Lipshultz has been awarded research support for 37 projects throughout his career. This support helped to further the clinical understanding of Peyronie’s disease, prostate cancer, Sertoli cells, erectile dysfunction, testosterone replacement therapy, and male infertility.

=== Books ===
In 1999, Lipshultz co-authored Disease of the Testis. Fast Facts- Indispensable Guides to Clinical Practice. This text provides a comprehensive guide for providers to diagnose and manage the various diseases that can affect the testes.

Lipshultz was a primary editor of Urology and the Primary Care Practitioner. This text is intended to provide information on current diagnostic methods of common urological problems as well as guidance on when a referral to a urologist is appropriate for individuals practicing in a primary care setting.

MMost recently, Infertility in the Male (5th ed.) was published in August 2023 with Lipshultz as a co-editor. The book covers a range of topics in male reproductive medicine and surgery.

To date, Lipshultz has edited 13 books, written 125 book chapters, and 29 editorial comments.

== Appearances in the media ==
Lipshultz’s first appearance in the media came in 1993, when he appeared on the “Today Show” on NBC News during the weeklong series on infertility. He gave a live video interview on “Erectile Dysfunction and Diabetic Men” on Channel 45 and reappeared on NBC News in 2002. Following these appearances, Lipshultz has been quoted in 10 news articles from varying sources, including The New York Times, Houston Chronicle, and The Washington Post.

Lipshultz appeared on the Urology Care Podcast in 2022 to discuss vasectomy reversals. He was most recently on the BackTable Urology Podcast in 2023 as part of the series “Legends in Urology” to discuss his outstanding career and experiences in the field of urology.

In addition to his podcast and television appearances, Lipshultz has several YouTube videos outlining his surgical techniques for a vasovasostomy, epididymovasostomy, gender-affirming surgery, and penile implants (IPP).

== Academic honors and awards ==
Lipshultz has received numerous honors throughout his career including the Barbara Eck Menning Founder’s Award from RESOLVE: The National Fertility Association in 1995. He won the Hugh Hampton Young Award from the American Urological Association and was the recipient of the American Foundation for Urologic Disease (AFUD)/ American Urological Association Education and Research (AUAER) Distinguished Past Scholar Award in 2005. In 2012, Lipshultz won the American Society of Reproductive Medicine Service Milestone Award. He won the F. Brantley Scott Award of Excellence, F. Brantley Scott Physician Academy, American Medical Systems in 2015. In 2022, Lipshultz was awarded the American Association of Genitourinary Surgeons Spence Award of the AAGUS and the Kavoussi Family Outstanding Teacher Award of the American Society for Reproductive Medicine. Most recently, Lipshultz won the Androgen Society Dedication to Education Award in 2023.
