= Data technology =

Data technology (may be shortened to DataTech or DT) is the technology connected to areas such as martech or adtech. Data technology sector includes solutions for data management, and products or services that are based on data generated by both human and machines. DataTech is an emerging industry that uses Artificial Intelligence, Big Data analysis and Machine Learning algorithms to improve business activities in various sectors, such as digital marketing, or business analysis (e.g. predictive analytics).

== Key areas ==
Data technology has been used to manage big data sets, build solutions for data management and integrate data from various sources to discover new business or analytical insights from collected information.

Growing global amount of generated data (the number is forecast to reach 163 zettabytes in 2025) determines spendings on technologies that help control data assets. The big data market is expected to reach $156.72 billion by 2026. Spendings on data, including data technologies, in digital marketing reach $26.0 B in 2019 globally.

Data technologies are developed to help manage data generated by human or by machines, which will be 200 billion by 2020. Data technologies aim to manage growing data streams, get valuable insights from data and find solutions to integrate the most important data sources for companies and organizations. Therefore, key areas for DataTech sector are:

- Data Management Technologies - technologies and platforms for managing growing sets of data, such as data generated by customers (1st, 2nd and 3rd party data). Common platforms for managing data are Data Management Platform or Customer Data Platform.
- Data Integration - services that match the data from two or more sources to get more information about stored data. If company collects user data in Customer-relationship management system, it can enrich it with the data from external sources to create 360-customer view (by integrating data, the company will know e.g. interests, demography and intentions of users who are in their databases).
- Data Consulting - services based on analysing customer data and discovering insights from big data sets. It uses Machine Learning algorithms to find useful information from chaotic data, supporting decision making across industries such as healthcare, finance and logistics.
- Technologies for AdTech sector - products and services that support digital marketing environment, including SSP, Demand-side platform and services used for targeting the right group in online campaigns.
- Building strategic data ecosystem - service that allow to build data ecosystem in organization, by identifying and choosing the right data sources, integrating data and preparing adequate analytical algorithms to discover new insights about customers.
- Internet of Things - products and services that helps store and manage data generated by machines.
