= Document clustering =

Grouping texts by similarity

Document clustering (or text clustering) is the application of cluster analysis to textual documents. It has applications in automatic document organization, topic extraction and fast information retrieval or filtering.

== Overview ==
Document clustering involves the use of descriptors and descriptor extraction. Descriptors are sets of words that describe the contents within the cluster. Document clustering is generally considered to be a centralized process. Examples of document clustering include web document clustering for search users.

The application of document clustering can be categorized to two types, online and offline. Online applications are usually constrained by efficiency problems when compared to offline applications. Text clustering may be used for different tasks, such as grouping similar documents (news, tweets, etc.) and the analysis of customer/employee feedback, discovering meaningful implicit subjects across all documents.

In general, there are two common algorithms. The first one is the hierarchical based algorithm, which includes single link, complete linkage, group average and Ward's method. By aggregating or dividing, documents can be clustered into hierarchical structure, which is suitable for browsing. However, such an algorithm usually suffers from efficiency problems. The other algorithm is developed using the K-means algorithm and its variants. Generally hierarchical algorithms produce more in-depth information for detailed analyses, while algorithms based around variants of the K-means algorithm are more efficient and provide sufficient information for most purposes.

These algorithms can further be classified as hard or soft clustering algorithms. Hard clustering computes a hard assignment – each document is a member of exactly one cluster. The assignment of soft clustering algorithms is soft – a document's assignment is a distribution over all clusters. In a soft assignment, a document has fractional membership in several clusters. Dimensionality reduction methods can be considered a subtype of soft clustering; for documents, these include latent semantic indexing (truncated singular value decomposition on term histograms) and topic models.

Other algorithms involve graph based clustering, ontology supported clustering and order sensitive clustering.

Given a clustering, it can be beneficial to automatically derive human-readable labels for the clusters. Various methods exist for this purpose.

== Clustering in search engines ==
A web search engine often returns thousands of pages in response to a broad query, making it difficult for users to browse or to identify relevant information. Clustering methods can be used to automatically group the retrieved documents into a list of meaningful categories.

== Procedures ==
In practice, document clustering often takes the following steps:

1. Tokenization

Tokenization is the process of parsing text data into smaller units (tokens) such as words and phrases. Commonly used tokenization methods include Bag-of-words model and N-gram model.

2. Stemming and lemmatization

Different tokens might carry out similar information (e.g. tokenization and tokenizing). And we can avoid calculating similar information repeatedly by reducing all tokens to its base form using various stemming and lemmatization dictionaries.

3. Removing stop words and punctuation

Some tokens are less important than others. For instance, common words such as "the" might not be very helpful for revealing the essential characteristics of a text. So usually it is a good idea to eliminate stop words and punctuation marks before doing further analysis.

4. Computing term frequencies or tf-idf

After pre-processing the text data, we can then proceed to generate features. For document clustering, one of the most common ways to generate features for a document is to calculate the term frequencies of all its tokens. Although not perfect, these frequencies can usually provide some clues about the topic of the document. And sometimes it is also useful to weight the term frequencies by the inverse document frequencies. See tf-idf for detailed discussions.

5. Clustering

We can then cluster different documents based on the features we have generated. See the algorithm section in cluster analysis for different types of clustering methods.

6. Evaluation and visualization

Finally, the clustering models can be assessed by various metrics. And it is sometimes helpful to visualize the results by plotting the clusters into low (two) dimensional space. See multidimensional scaling as a possible approach.

== Clustering v. Classifying ==
Clustering algorithms in computational text analysis groups documents into grouping a set of text what are called subsets or clusters where the algorithm's goal is to create internally coherent clusters that are distinct from one another. Classification on the other hand, is a form of supervised learning where the features of the documents are used to predict the "type" of documents.

== See also ==
- Cluster
- Fuzzy clustering

== Bibliography ==
- Christopher D. Manning, Prabhakar Raghavan, and Hinrich Schütze. Flat Clustering in Introduction to Information Retrieval. Cambridge University Press. 2008
- Nicholas O. Andrews and Edward A. Fox, Recent Developments in Document Clustering, October 16, 2007
- Claudio Carpineto, Stanislaw Osiński, Giovanni Romano, Dawid Weiss. A survey of Web clustering engines. ACM Computing Surveys, Volume 41, Issue 3 (July 2009), Article No. 17, ISSN 0360-0300
- Wui Lee Chang, Kai Meng Tay, and Chee Peng Lim, A New Evolving Tree-Based Model with Local Re-learning for Document Clustering and Visualization, Neural Processing Letters, DOI: 10.1007/s11063-017-9597-3. https://link.springer.com/article/10.1007/s11063-017-9597-3
