= Web query classification =

A web query topic classification/categorization is a problem in information science. The task is to assign a web search query to one or more predefined categories, based on its topics. The importance of query classification is underscored by many services provided by Web search. A direct application is to provide better search result pages for users with interests in different categories. For example, users issuing a Web query such as "apple" might expect to see Web pages related to the fruit apple, or they may prefer to see products or news related to the computer company. Online advertisement services can rely on the query classification results to promote different products more accurately. Search result pages can be grouped according to the categories predicted by a query classification algorithm. However, the computation of query classification is non-trivial. Different from the document classification tasks, queries submitted by Web search users are usually short and ambiguous; also the meanings of the queries are evolving over time. Therefore, query topic classification is much more difficult than traditional document classification tasks.

== Difficulties ==
Web query topic classification is to automatically assign a query to some predefined categories. Different from the traditional document classification tasks, there are several major difficulties which hinder the progress of Web query understanding:

=== Derive an appropriate feature representation for Web queries ===
Many queries are short, and query terms are often noisy. For instance, in the KDDCUP 2005 dataset, queries containing 3 words are the most frequent (22%). Additionally, 79% of queries consist of no more than 4 words. A user query frequently carries multiple meanings. For example, "apple" could refer to a type of fruit or a computer company, while "Java" could signify a programming language or an island in Indonesia. In the KDDCUP 2005 dataset, a majority of queries contain more than one meaning. Therefore, only using the keywords of the query to set up a vector space model for classification is not appropriate.

Query-enrichment based methods start by enriching user queries to a collection of text documents through search engines. Thus, each query is represented by a pseudo-document which consists of the snippets of top ranked result pages retrieved by search engine. Subsequently, the text documents are classified into the target categories using synonym based classifier or statistical classifiers, such as Naive Bayes (NB) and Support Vector Machines (SVMs).

=== Adapting to changes of the queries and categories over time ===
The meanings of queries may also evolve over time. Therefore, the old labeled training queries may be out-of-data and useless soon. How to make the classifier adaptive over time becomes a big issue. For example, the word "Barcelona" has a new meaning of the new micro-processor of AMD, while it refers to a city or football club before 2007. The distribution of the meanings of this term is therefore a function of time on the Web.

Intermediate taxonomy based method first builds a bridging classifier on an intermediate taxonomy, such as Open Directory Project (ODP), in an offline mode. This classifier is then used in an online mode to map user queries to the target categories via the intermediate taxonomy. The advantage of this approach is that the bridging classifier needs to be trained only once and is adaptive for each new set of target categories and incoming queries.

=== Using unlabeled query logs to help with query classification ===
Because manually labeling training data for query classification is costly and time-consuming, researchers have looked for ways to use the vast amounts of unlabeled data available in web search engine query logs. These logs capture how people search for information and interact with search engines. Over time, they have become a valuable source of information, reflecting users' search behavior and collective knowledge of the World Wide Web.

Query clustering method tries to associate related queries by clustering "session data", which contain multiple queries and click-through information from a single user interaction. They take into account terms from result documents that a set of queries has in common. The use of query keywords together with session data is shown to be the most effective method of performing query clustering.

Selectional preference based method tries to exploit some association rules between the query terms to help with the query classification. Given the training data, they exploit several classification approaches including exact-match using labeled data, N-Gram match using labeled data and classifiers based on perception. They emphasize on an approach adapted from computational linguistics named selectional preferences. If x and y form a pair (x; y) and y belongs to category c, then all other pairs (x; z) headed by x belong to c. They use unlabeled query log data to mine these rules and validate the effectiveness of their approaches on some labeled queries.

== Applications ==
- Metasearch engines send a user's query to multiple search engines and blend the top results from each into one overall list. The search engine can organize the large number of Web pages in the search results, according to the potential categories of the issued query, for the convenience of Web users' navigation.
- Vertical search, compared to general search, focuses on specific domains and addresses the particular information needs of niche audiences and professions. Once the search engine can predict the category of information a Web user is looking for, it can select a certain vertical search engine automatically, without forcing the user to access the vertical search engine explicitly.
- Online advertising aims at providing interesting advertisements to Web users during their search activities. The search engine can provide relevant advertising to Web users according to their interests, so that the Web users can save time and effort in research while the advertisers can reduce their advertising costs.

All these services rely on the understanding Web users' search intents through their Web queries.

== See also ==
- Document classification
- Web search query
- Information retrieval
- Query expansion
- Naive Bayes classifier
- Support vector machines
- Meta search
- Vertical search
- Online advertising
