= Julie Beth Lovins =

American computational linguist (1945–2018)

- Born: October 19, 1945; Washington, D.C., U.S.
- Died: January 26, 2018 (aged 72); Mountain View, California, U.S.
- Education: Pembroke College, Brown University (BA); University of Chicago (MA, PhD)
- Known for: The Lovins Stemming Algorithm
- Spouse: Greg Fowler
- Awards: Bloch Fellowship, Linguistic Society of America (1970)
- Scientific career
- Fields: Computational linguistics, linguistics, speech synthesis
- Workplaces: Bell Labs; Tsuda College; University of Tokyo
- Thesis: Loan Phonology -- Subject Matter (1973)

Julie Beth Lovins (October 19, 1945, in Washington, D.C. – January 26, 2018, in Mountain View, California) was a computational linguist who published The Lovins Stemming Algorithm - a type of stemming algorithm for word matching - in 1968.

The Lovins Stemmer is a single pass, context sensitive stemmer, which removes endings based on the longest-match principle. The stemmer was the first to be published and was extremely well developed considering the date of its release, having been the main influence on a large amount of the future work in the area. -Adam G., et al

== Background ==
Born on October 19, 1945, in Washington, D.C., Lovins grew up in Amherst, Massachusetts. Her father Gerald H. Lovins was an engineer and her mother, Miriam Lovins, a social services administrator. Lovins' brother Amory Lovins is the co-founder and chief environmental scientist of Rocky Mountain Institute.

For her undergraduate degree, Lovins attended Pembroke College, the women's college of Brown University, which later combined into Brown University in 1971. At Pembroke College, Lovins studied mathematics and linguistics, graduating with honors. Her thesis was named, A Study of Idioms. She received the inaugural Bloch Fellowship in 1970 from the Linguistic Society of America to attend graduate school. Lovins obtained her Master of Arts in 1970 and Doctor of Philosophy in 1973 from the University of Chicago, studying linguistics. At the University of Chicago, her dissertation was titled, Loan Phonology -- Subject Matter. A revision of her thesis on loanwords and the phonological structure of Japanese was published in 1975 by the Indiana University Linguistics Club.

== Teaching career ==
Following Lovins' PhD, she spent a year working as a linguist-at-large at a University of Tokyo language research institute and as an English conversation teacher. She then joined the faculty at Tsuda College as a professor of English and linguistics, where she taught for seven years. During her time as a faculty member at Tsuda College, Lovins also served as a guest researcher in the University of Tokyo's Research Institute of Logopedics and Phoniatrics, a research center for speech science.

== Industry career ==
After teaching Japanese phonology at Japanese universities abroad, Lovins moved back to the U.S. to work in the computing industry. She worked on early speech synthesis at Bell Labs in Murray Hill, New Jersey. At Bell Labs, Lovins worked with Osamu Fujimura, a Japanese linguist who is credited as a pioneer in speech sciences.

Lovins also worked as a software engineer at various companies in Silicon Valley and served as a consultant for computational linguistics throughout the 1990s. As a consultant, she called her business, "The Language Doctor."

== The Lovins Stemming Algorithm ==
Lovins published an article about her work on developing a stemming algorithm through the Research Laboratory of Electronics at MIT in 1968. Lovins' stemming algorithm is frequently referred to as the Lovins stemmer.

A stemming algorithm is the process of taking a word with suffixes and reducing it to its root, or base word. Stemming algorithms are used to improve the accuracy in information retrieval and in domain analysis. These algorithms help find variants of the terms being queried. Stemming algorithms bring value in their reduction of a given query into its less complex form, allowing more similar documents to be retrieved for similar queries. Stemming algorithms are prevalent in search engines, such as Google Search, which did not implement word stemming until 2003. This means that up until 2003, a Google search for the word warm would not have explicitly returned results for related words like warmth or warming.

As the first published stemming algorithm, Lovins' work set a precedent and influenced future work in stemming algorithms, such as the Porter Stemmer published by Martin Porter in 1980 which has been recognized widely as the most common stemming algorithm for stemming English. Additionally, the Dawson Stemmer developed by John Dawson is an extension of the Lovins stemmer.

The Lovins stemmer follows a rule-based affix elimination approach. It first removes the longest identifiable suffix from the target word - producing a base stem word - then indexes a lookup table to convert the (potentially malformed) stem word to a valid word. This process can be split into two phases. In the first phase, a word is compared with a pre-determined list of endings, and when a word is found to contain one of these endings, the ending is removed, leaving only the stem of the word. The second phase standardizes spelling exceptions that come from the first phase, ensuring that words with only marginally varying stems are appropriately paired together. For example, with the word dried, phase one results in dri, which should match with the word dry. The second phase takes care of these exceptions.

Compared to other stemmers, Lovins' algorithm is fast and equipped to handle irregular plural words like person and people. Disadvantages, however, include many suffixes not being available in the table of endings. Furthermore, it is sometimes highly unreliable and frequently fails to form valid words from the stems or to match the stems of like-meaning words. This is most often caused by the usage of specialist terminology and domain-specific vocabulary by the author.

== Personal life ==
Lovins moved to Mountain View, California, in 1979, and later to Old Mountain View in 1981 with her partner and later husband Greg Fowler, a software engineer and advocate for environmental issues & the blind.

In their free time, she and her husband enjoyed taking walks and volunteering for their local community. Lovins actively volunteered for organizations like the Old Mountain View Neighborhood Association, Mountain View Friends of the Library, League of Women Voters, Mountain View Cool Cities Team, and the Mountain View Sustainability Task Force.

In 2016, Lovins' husband died unexpectedly, following a heart attack. Eighteen days after her husband died, Lovins was diagnosed with brain cancer. She died on January 26, 2018, at a hospice, surrounded by friends, family and caregivers.
