= Melvin Earl Maron =

American computer scientist

- Known for: Probabilistic indexing; Legal information retrieval
- Scientific career
- Fields: Computer Science
- Workplaces: University of California, Berkeley

Melvin Earl "Bill" Maron (Jan 23, 1924 - September 28, 2016) was an American computer scientist and emeritis professor of University of California, Berkeley. He studied mechanical engineering and physics at the University of Nebraska and received his Ph.D. in philosophy from the University of California in 1951. Maron is best known for his work on probabilistic information retrieval which he published together with his friend and colleague Lary Kuhns. Quite remarkably, Maron also pioneered relational databases, proposing a system called the Relational Data File in 1967, on which Ted Codd based his Relational model of data.
