= Galago (disambiguation) =

A Galago, also known as a bushbaby, is a small nocturnal primate.

Galago may also refer to:

- Lemur Project, an open-source project containing the Galago search engine
- Galago (magazine), a Swedish comics and illustrations magazine

== See also ==
- Galgo, a traditional Korean drum
- Galgo Español, a breed of dog
