= Search query =

Search query may refer to:

- Database query
- Web search query

== See also ==
- Search engine (computing)
