= Query understanding =

Search engine processing step

Query understanding is the process of inferring the intent of a search engine user by extracting semantic meaning from the searcher’s keywords. Query understanding methods generally take place before the search engine retrieves and ranks results. It is related to natural language processing but specifically focused on the understanding of search queries.

== Methods ==
=== Stemming and lemmatization ===
Many languages inflect words to reflect their role in the utterance they appear in. The variation between various forms of a word is likely to be of little importance for the relatively coarse-grained model of meaning involved in a retrieval system, and for this reason the task of conflating the various forms of a word is a potentially useful technique to increase recall of a retrieval system.

Stemming algorithms, also known as stemmers, typically use a collection of simple rules to remove suffixes intended to model the language’s inflection rules.

For some languages, there are simple lemmatisation methods to reduce a word in query to its lemma or root form or its stem; for others, this operation involves non-trivial string processing and may require recognizing the word's part of speech or referencing a lexical database.

The effectiveness of stemming and lemmatization varies across languages.

=== Query Segmentation ===
Query segmentation is a key component of query understanding, aiming to divide a query into meaningful segments. Traditional approaches, such as the bag-of-words model, treat individual words as independent units, which can limit interpretative accuracy. For languages like Chinese, where words are not separated by spaces, segmentation is essential, as individual characters often lack standalone meaning. Even in English, the BOW model may not capture the full meaning, as certain phrases—such as "New York"—carry significance as a whole rather than as isolated terms. By identifying phrases or entities within queries, query segmentation enhances interpretation, enabling search engines to apply proximity and ordering constraints, ultimately improving search accuracy and user satisfaction.

=== Entity recognition ===
Entity recognition is the process of locating and classifying entities within a text string. Named-entity recognition specifically focuses on named entities, such as names of people, places, and organizations. In addition, entity recognition includes identifying concepts in queries that may be represented by multi-word phrases. Entity recognition systems typically use grammar-based linguistic techniques or statistical machine learning models.

=== Query rewriting ===
Query rewriting is the process of automatically reformulating a search query to more accurately capture its intent. Query expansion adds additional query terms, such as synonyms, in order to retrieve more documents and thereby increase recall. Query relaxation removes query terms to reduce the requirements for a document to match the query, thereby also increasing recall. Other forms of query rewriting, such as automatically converting consecutive query terms into phrases and restricting query terms to specific fields, aim to increase precision.

=== Spelling Correction ===
Automatic spelling correction is a critical feature of modern search engines, designed to address common spelling errors in user queries. Such errors are especially frequent as users often search for unfamiliar topics. By correcting misspelled queries, search engines enhance their understanding of user intent, thereby improving the relevance and quality of search results and overall user experience.
