= Topic-based vector space model =

The Topic-based Vector Space Model (TVSM) (literature: ) extends the vector space model of information retrieval by removing the constraint that the term-vectors be orthogonal. The assumption of orthogonal terms is incorrect regarding natural languages which causes problems with synonyms and strong related terms. This facilitates the use of stopword lists, stemming and thesaurus in TVSM. In contrast to the generalized vector space model the TVSM does not depend on concurrence-based similarities between terms.

== Definitions ==
The basic premise of TVSM is the existence of a d dimensional space R with only positive axis intercepts, i.e. R in R^{+} and d in N^{+}. Each dimension of R represents a fundamental topic. A term vector t has a specific weight for a certain R. To calculate these weights assumptions are made taking into account the document contents. Ideally important terms will have a high weight and stopwords and irrelevants terms to the topic will have a low weight. The TVSM document model is obtained as a sum of term vectors representing terms in the document. The similarity between two documents Di and Dj is defined as the scalar product of document vectors.

== Enhanced Topic-based Vector Space Model ==
The enhancement of the Enhanced Topic-based Vector Space Model (eTVSM) (literature: ) is a proposal on how to derive term vectors from an Ontology. Using a synonym Ontology created from WordNet Kuropka shows good results for document similarity. If a trivial Ontology is used the results are similar to Vector Space model.

== Implementations ==
- Implementation of eTVSM in python
