= DFR =

DFR may refer to:

- Cosworth DFR, a 1987 race car engine
- Dean Forest Railway, Gloucestershire, England
- Decreasing failure rate
- Deutscher Frauenring, a political advocacy organisation in Germany
- Dihydroflavonol 4-reductase, an enzyme class
- Divergence-from-randomness model, in information retrieval
- Dounreay Fast Reactor, Scotland
- Dual fluid reactor
