= Divergence-from-randomness model =

In the field of information retrieval, divergence from randomness (DFR) is a generalization of one of the very first models, Harter's 2-Poisson indexing-model. It is one type of probabilistic model. It is used to measure the amount of information carried in documents. The 2-Poisson model is based on the hypothesis that the level of documents is related to a set of documents that contains words that occur to a relatively greater extent than in the rest of the documents. It is not a model, but a framework for weighting terms using probabilistic methods, and it has a special relationship for term weighting.

Term weights serve as the standard of whether a specific word is in that set or not. Term weights are computed by measuring the divergence between a term distribution produced by a random process and the actual term distribution.

Divergence from randomness models set up by instantiating the three main components of the framework: first selecting a basic randomness model, then applying the first normalization and finally normalizing the term frequencies.

== Definition ==
The divergence from randomness is based on this idea: "The more the divergence of the within-document term-frequency from its frequency within the collection, the more the information carried by the word t in document d. In other words, the term-weight is inversely related to the probability of term-frequency within the document d obtained by a model M of randomness."

$\text{weight}(t|d) =k\text{Prob}_M(t\in d|\text{Collection})$ (Formula 1)

1. M represents the type of model of randomness which employs to calculate the probability.
2. d is the total number of words in the documents.
3. t is the number of a specific word in d.
4. k is defined by M.

It is possible that we use different URN models to choose the appropriate model M of randomness. In information retrieval, there are documents instead of URNs, and terms instead of colors. There are several ways to choose M, each of which has a basic divergence from randomness model to support it.

== Model ==
=== Basic Models ===
D      Divergence approximation of the binomial
P      Approximation of the binomial
BE        Bose-Einstein distribution
G  Geometric approximation of the  Bose-Einstein 
I(n)   Inverse Document Frequency Model
I(F)   Inverse Term Frequency Model
I(ne) Inverse Expected Document Frequency Model

=== DFR Models ===
BB2    Bernoulli-Einstein model with Bernoulli after-effect and normalization 2.
IFB2    Inverse Term Frequency model with Bernoulli after-effect and normalization 2.
In-expB2 Inverse Expected Document Frequency model with Bernoulli after-effect and normalization 2. The logarithms are base 2. This model can be used for classic ad-hoc tasks.
In-expC2  Inverse Expected Document Frequency model with Bernoulli after-effect and normalization 2. The logarithms are base e. This model can be used for classic ad-hoc tasks.
InL2    Inverse Document Frequency model with Laplace after-effect and normalization 2. This model can be used for tasks that require early precision.
PL2    Poisson model with Laplace after-effect and normalization 2. This model can be used for tasks that require early precision[7,8].

== First normalization ==
When a specific rare term cannot be found in a document, then in that document, the term has approximately zero probability of being informative. On the other hand, if a rare term occurs frequently in a document, it can have a very high, near 100% probability to be informative for the topic mentioned by the document. Applying to Ponte and Croft's language model can also provide further data. A risk component is considered in the DFR. Logically speaking, if the term-frequency in the document is relatively high, then inversely the risk for the term of not being informative is relatively small. If Formula 1 gives a high value, then there is a minimal risk that it has the negative effect of showing small information gain. As a result, the weight of Formula one is organized 1 to only consider the portion of which is the amount of information gained with the term. The more the term occurs in the elite set, the less term-frequency is due to randomness, and thus the smaller the associated risk is. We use two models to compute the information-gain with a term within a document: the Laplace L model and the ratio of two Bernoulli's processes B.

== Term frequency normalization ==
Before using the within-document frequency tf of a term, the document-length dl is normalized to a standard length sl. Therefore, the term-frequencies tf are recalculated with respect to the standard document-length, that is:

 tfn = tf * log(1+ sl/dl) (normalization 1)

tfn represents the normalized term frequency. Another version of the normalization formula is the following:

 tfn = tf * log(1 + c*(sl/dl)) (normalization 2)

Normalization 2 is usually considered to be more flexible, since there is no fixed value for c.

1. tf is the term-frequency of the term t in the document d
2. dl is the document-length.
3. sl is the standard length.

== Mathematic and statistical tools ==
=== The probability space ===
==== Sampling space V ====
Utility-Theoretic Indexing developed by Cooper and Maron is a theory of indexing based on utility theory. To reflect the value for documents that is expected by the users, index terms are assigned to documents. Also, Utility-Theoretic Indexing is related to an "event space" in the statistical world. There are several basic spaces Ω in the Information Retrieval. A really simple basic space Ω can be the set V of terms t, which is called the vocabulary of the document collection. Since Ω=V is the set of all mutually exclusive events, Ω can also be the certain event with probability:

   
  
    
      
        P
        (
        V
        )
        =
        
          ∑
          
            t
            
              ∈
            
            ⁡
            V
          
        
        P
        (
        t
        )
        =
        1
      
    
    {\displaystyle P(V)=\sum _{t\mathop {\in } V}P(t)=1}
  

Thus P, the probability distribution, assigns probabilities to all sets of terms for the vocabulary. Notice that the basic problem of Information Retrieval is to find an estimate for P(t). Estimates are computed on the basis of sampling and the experimental text collection furnishes the samples needed for the estimation. Now we run into the main concern which is how do we treat two arbitrary but heterogeneous pieces of texts appropriately. Paragons like a chapter in a Science Magazine and an article from a sports newspaper as the other. They can be considered as two different samples since they aim at different populations.

==== Sampling with a document ====
The relationship of the document with the experiments is made by the way in which the sample space is chosen. In IR, term experiment, or trial, is used here with a technical meaning rather than its common sense. For example, a document could be an experiment, which means the document is a sequence of outcomes t∈V, or just a sample of a population. We will talk about the event of observing a number Xt =tf of occurrences of a given word t in a sequence of experiments. In order to introduce this event space, we should introduce the product of the probability spaces associated with the experiments of the sequence. We could introduce our sample space to associate a point with possible configurations of the outcomes. The one-to-one correspondence for sample space can be defined as:

  
  
    
      
        
          Ω
        
        =
        
          V
          
            
              l
              
                d
              
            
          
        
      
    
    {\displaystyle \mathop {\Omega } =V^{l_{d}}}
  

Where ld is the number of trials of the experiment or in this example, the length of a document. We can assume that each outcome may or may not depend on the outcomes of the previous experiments. If the experiments are designed so that an outcome influences the subsequent outcomes, then the probability distribution on V is different at each trial. But, more commonly, in order to establish the simpler case when the probability space is invariant in IR, the term independence assumption is often made. Therefore, all possible configurations of Ω=Vld are considered equiprobable. Considering this assumption, we can consider each document a Bernoulli process. The probability spaces of the product are invariant and the probability of a given sequence is the product of the probabilities at each trial. Consequently, if p=P(t) is the prior probability that the outcome is t and the number of experiments is ld we obtain the probability of $X_t=tf$ is equal to:

  
  
    
      
        P
        (
        
          X
          
            t
          
        
        =
        t
        f
        
          |
        
        p
        )
        =
        
          
            
              (
            
            
              
                l
                
                  d
                
              
              
                t
                f
              
            
            
              )
            
          
        
        
          p
          
            t
            f
          
        
        
          q
          
            
              
                l
                
                  d
                
              
            
            −
            t
            f
          
        
      
    
    {\displaystyle P(X_{t}=tf|p)={\binom {l_{d}}{tf}}p^{tf}q^{{l_{d}}-tf}}
  

Which is the sum of the probability of all possible configurations having tf outcomes out of ld. P(Xt=tf|p) is a probability distribution because

 
  
    
      
        
          ∑
          
            t
            
              ∈
            
            ⁡
            V
          
        
        P
        (
        
          X
          
            t
          
        
        =
        t
        f
        
          |
        
        p
        )
        =
        (
        p
        +
        q
        
          )
          
            
              l
              
                d
              
            
          
        
        =
        1
      
    
    {\displaystyle \sum _{t\mathop {\in } V}P(X_{t}=tf|p)=(p+q)^{l_{d}}=1}
  

1. $l_d$ The length of document d.
2. tf The term frequency of t in document d.
3. $X_t$ The number of occurrence of a specific word in one list.

==== Multiple samplings ====
Already considering the hypothesis of having a single sample, we need to consider that we have several samples, for example, a collection D of documents. The situation of having a collection of N documents is abstractly equivalent to the scheme of placing a certain number Tot of V colored types of balls in a collection of N cells. For each term t∈V a possible configuration of ball placement satisfies the equations:

 tf1+...+tfN=Ft

And the condition

 F1+...+FV=Tot

Here, Ft represents the balls of the same color t to be distributed in the N cells. We have thus changed the basic space. The outcome of our experiment will be the documents d in which the ball will be placed. Also, we will have a lot of possible configurations consistent with the number of colored balls.

1. Ft The total number of tokens of t in the collection.
2. Tot The total number of tokens in the collection D

== Conclusion ==
The divergence from Randomness Model is based on the Bernoulli model and its limiting forms, the hypergeometric distribution, Bose–Einstein statistics and its limiting forms, the compound of the binomial distribution with the beta distribution, and the fat-tailed distribution. Divergence from randomness model shows a unifying framework that has the potential for constructing various effective models of IR.

== Applications ==
=== Applications and characteristics ===
1. The Divergence from randomness model can be applied in automatic indexing in information retrieval. These can be explained as the dissertation elite, the notion of an informative content of a term within a document.
2. The effectiveness of the models based on divergence from randomness is very high in comparison with both BM25 and language model. For short queries, the performance of the models of divergence from randomness is definitely better than the BM25 Model, which since 1994 has been used as a standard baseline for the comparison of the models.
3. The Divergence from randomness model can show the best performance with only a few documents comparing to other query expansion skills.
4. The framework of Divergence from randomness model is very general and flexible. With the query expansion provided for each component, we can apply different technologies in order to get the best performance.

=== Proximity ===
Proximity can be handled within divergence from randomness to consider the number of occurrences of a pair of query terms within a window of pre-defined size. To specify, the DFR Dependence Score Modifier DSM implements both the pBiL and pBiL2 models, which calculate the randomness divided by the document's length, rather than the statistics of the pair in the corpus the pair in the corpus.

== Examples of divergence from randomness ==
Let t be a term and c be a collection. Let the term occur in tfc=nL(t,c)=200 locations, and in df(t,c)=100 documents. The expected average term frequency is avgtf(t,c)=200/100=2; this is the average over the documents in which the term occurs. Let N.D(c)=1000 be the total number of documents. The term's occurrence is 10% in the documents: P.D(t|c)=100/1000. The expected average term frequency is 200/1000=1/5, and this is the average over all documents. The term frequency is shown as Kt =0,...,6.

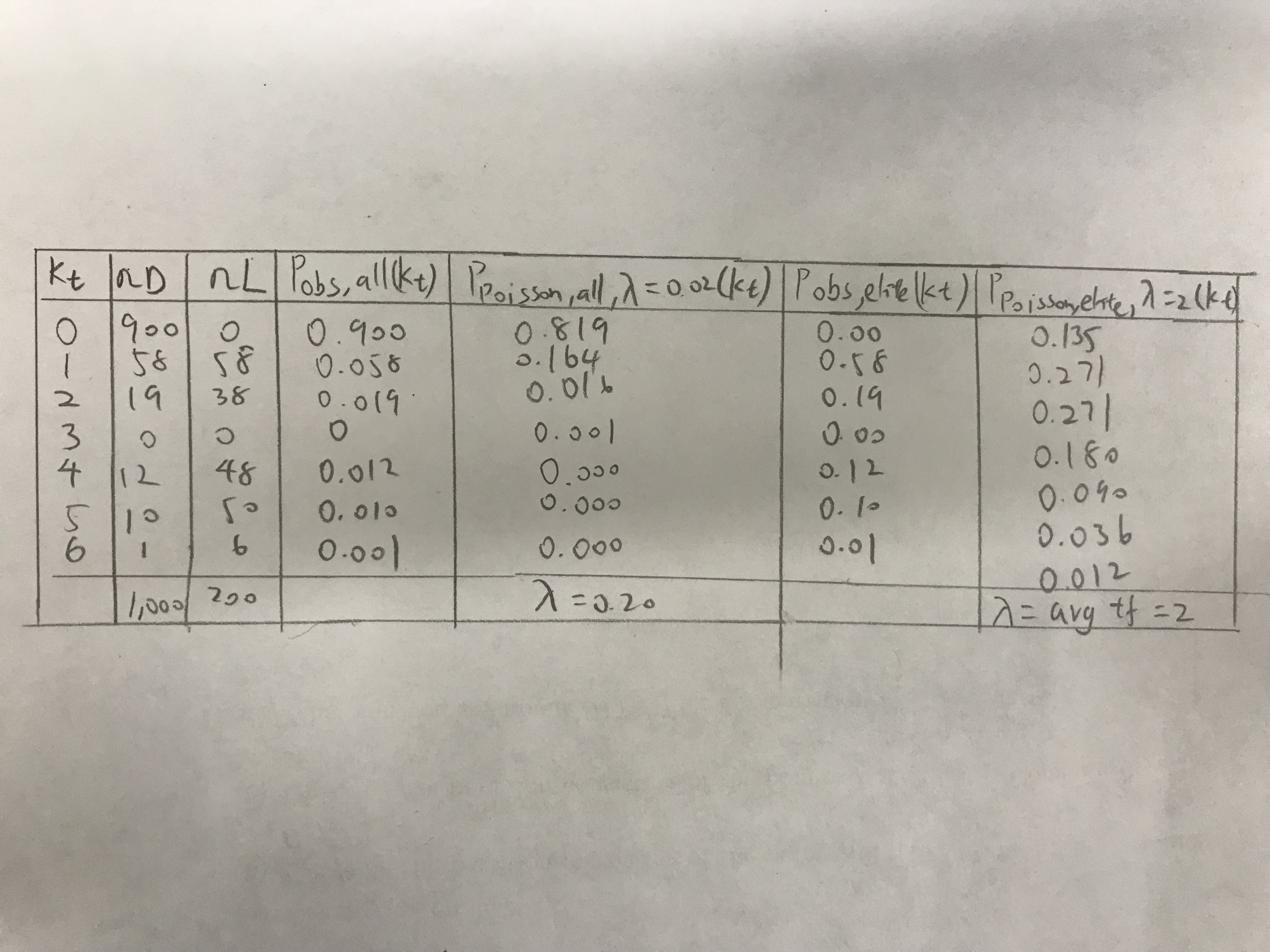

The following table shows the column nD is the number of Documents that contain kt occurrence of t, shown as nD(t,c,kt). Another column nL is the number of Locations at which the term occurs, followed by this equation: nL=kt*nD. The columns to the right show the observed and Poisson probabilities. P obs,elite(Kt) is the observed probability over all documents. P Poisson, all, lambda(Kt) is the Poisson probability, where lambda(t,c)=nL(t,c)/N D(c)=0.20 is the Poisson parameter. The table illustrates how the observed probability is different from the Poisson probability. P Poisson(1) is greater than P obs(1), whereas for kt>1, the observed probabilities are greater than the Poisson probabilities. There is more mass in the tail of the observed distribution than the Poisson distribution assumes. Moreover, the columns to the right illustrate the usage of the elite documents instead of all documents. Here, the single event probability is based on the locations of elite documents only.

=== Further interest of examples ===
1. Adjusting document length.
2. Applying DFR in content-only XML Documents
3. Introduction to DFR models
