= Boolean model of information retrieval =

Classical information retrieval model

The (standard) Boolean model of information retrieval (BIR) is a classical information retrieval (IR) model where documents are retrieved based on whether they satisfy the conditions of a query that uses Boolean logic. As the first and most-adopted information retrieval model, it treats each document as a set of words, or terms. A user's query uses logical operators like AND, OR, and NOT to create a rule for retrieval. The system then returns all documents that match the rule.

== Definitions ==
In the Boolean model, documents and queries are represented using concepts from set theory. A document is seen as a simple collection (a set) of terms, and a query is a formal statement (a Boolean expression) that specifies which terms must or must not be present in a retrieved document.

- An index term (or term) is a keyword that characterizes the content of a document. Terms are the fundamental units of the model. Common, low-information words (called stop words) like "a", "the", and "is" are typically excluded from being used as index terms.
- A document is represented as a set of index terms. This is a bag-of-words model, meaning the order and frequency of terms in the original document are ignored. For example, a document about Bayes' theorem might be represented simply as the set $\{\text{Bayes' theorem, probability, decision-making}\}$.
- A query is a formal expression of the user's information need, written using index terms and Boolean operators (AND, OR, NOT). The model retrieves every document that is considered a "match" for this logical expression.

=== Formal representation ===
The model can be defined formally as follows:

- Let $T = \{t_1, t_2, \ldots, t_k\}$ be a set of all index terms.
- A document $D_j$ is any subset of $T$.
- A query $Q$ is a Boolean expression, typically in conjunctive normal form:
  $$Q = (t_a \lor t_b) \land (\lnot t_c \lor t_d) \land \dots$$
  where $t_a, t_b, \dots \in T$.

Retrieval is the process of identifying the set of all documents $\{D_j\}$ that satisfy the query $Q$. For example, for the simple query $Q = t_a \land t_b$, the system would retrieve all documents whose set of terms contains both $t_a$ and $t_b$.

== Example ==
Let the set of original (real) documents be, for example

$$D = \{D_1,\ D_2,\ D_3\}$$

where

$D_1$ = "Bayes' principle: The principle that, in estimating a parameter, one should initially assume that each possible value has equal probability (a uniform prior distribution)."

$D_2$ = "Bayesian decision theory: A mathematical theory of decision-making which presumes utility and probability functions, and according to which the act to be chosen is the Bayes act, i.e. the one with highest subjective expected utility. If one had unlimited time and calculating power with which to make every decision, this procedure would be the best way to make any decision."

$D_3$ = "Bayesian epistemology: A philosophical theory which holds that the epistemic status of a proposition (i.e. how well proven or well established it is) is best measured by a probability and that the proper way to revise this probability is given by Bayesian conditionalisation or similar procedures. A Bayesian epistemologist would use probability to define, and explore the relationship between, concepts such as epistemic status, support or explanatory power."

Let the set $T$ of terms be:
$$T = \{t_1=\text{Bayes' principle}, t_2=\text{probability}, t_3=\text{decision-making}, t_4=\text{Bayesian epistemology}\}$$
Then, the set $D$ of documents is as follows:
$$D = \{D_1,\ D_2,\ D_3\}$$
where
$$\begin{align}
D_1 &= \{\text{probability},\ \text{Bayes' principle}\} \\
D_2 &= \{\text{probability},\ \text{decision-making}\} \\
D_3 &= \{\text{probability},\ \text{Bayesian epistemology}\}
\end{align}$$
Let the query $Q$ be ("probability" AND "decision-making"):
$$Q = \text{probability} \and \text{decision-making}$$
Then to retrieve the relevant documents:

1. Firstly, the following sets $S_1$ and $S_2$ of documents $D_i$ are obtained (retrieved):
  $$\begin{align}
S_1 &= \{D_1,\ D_2,\ D_3\} \\
S_2 &= \{D_2\}
\end{align}$$
  Where $S_1$ corresponds to the documents which contain the term "probability" and $S_2$ contain the term "decision-making".
2. Finally, the following documents $D_i$ are retrieved in response to $Q$:
  $$Q: \{D_1,\ D_2,\ D_3\}\ \cap\ \{D_2\}\ =\ \{D_2\}$$
  Where the query looks for documents that are contained in both sets $S$ using the intersection operator.

This means that the original document $D_2$ is the answer to $Q$.

If there is more than one document with the same representation (the same subset of index terms $t_n$), every such document is retrieved. Such documents are indistinguishable in the BIR (in other words, equivalent).

== Advantages ==
- Clean formalism
- Easy to implement
- Intuitive concept
- If the resulting document set is either too small or too big, it is directly clear which operators will produce respectively a bigger or smaller set.
- It gives (expert) users a sense of control over the system. It is immediately clear why a document has been retrieved given a query.

== Disadvantages ==
- Exact matching may retrieve too few or too many documents
- Hard to translate a query into a Boolean expression
- Ineffective for Search-Resistant Concepts
- All terms are equally weighted
- More like data retrieval than information retrieval
- Retrieval based on binary decision criteria with no notion of partial matching
- No ranking of the documents is provided (absence of a grading scale)
- Information need has to be translated into a Boolean expression, which most users find awkward
- The Boolean queries formulated by the users are most often too simplistic
- The model frequently returns either too few or too many documents in response to a user query

== Data structures and algorithms ==
From a pure formal mathematical point of view, the BIR is straightforward. From a practical point of view, however, several further problems should be solved that relate to algorithms and data structures, such as, for example, the choice of terms (manual or automatic selection or both), stemming, hash tables, inverted file structure, and so on.

=== Hash sets ===
Another possibility is to use hash sets. Each document is represented by a hash table which contains every single term of that document. Since hash table size increases and decreases in real time with the addition and removal of terms, each document will occupy much less space in memory. However, it will have a slowdown in performance because the operations are more complex than with bit vectors. On the worst-case performance can degrade from O(n) to O(n^{2}). On the average case, the performance slowdown will not be that much worse than bit vectors and the space usage is much more efficient.

=== Signature file ===
Each document can be summarized by Bloom filter representing the set of words in that document, stored in a fixed-length bitstring, called a signature. The signature file contains one such superimposed code bitstring for every document in the collection. Each query can also be summarized by a Bloom filter representing the set of words in the query, stored in a bitstring of the same fixed length. The query bitstring is tested against each signature.

The signature file approached is used in BitFunnel.

=== Inverted file ===
An inverted index file contains two parts: a vocabulary containing all the terms used in the collection, and for each distinct term an inverted index that lists every document that mentions that term.
