= Clustering =

Clustering can refer to the following:

In computing:

- Computer cluster, the technique of linking many computers together to act like a single computer
- Data cluster, an allocation of contiguous storage in databases and file systems
- Cluster analysis, the statistical task of grouping a set of objects in such a way that objects in the same group are placed closer together (such as the k-means clustering)
- In hash tables, the mapping of keys to nearby slots

In economics:

- Business cluster, a geographic concentration of interconnected businesses, suppliers, and associated institutions in a particular field

In graph theory:

- The formation of clusters of linked nodes in a network, measured by the clustering coefficient
- Correlation clustering, a way of clustering nodes in a signed graph

== See also ==
- Cluster (disambiguation)
