= Multimodal learning =

Machine learning methods using multiple input modalities

Multimodal learning is a type of deep learning that integrates and processes multiple types of data, referred to as modalities, such as text, audio, images, or video. This integration allows for a more holistic understanding of complex data, improving model performance in tasks like visual question answering, cross-modal retrieval, text-to-image generation, aesthetic ranking, and image captioning.

Multimodal learning was proposed in 2011 at the beginning of the deep learning period. Large multimodal models, such as Google Gemini and GPT-4o, have become increasingly popular since 2023, enabling increased versatility and a broader understanding of real-world phenomena.

== Motivation ==
Data usually comes with different modalities which carry different information. For example, it is very common to caption an image to convey the information not presented in the image itself. Similarly, sometimes it is more straightforward to use an image to describe information which may not be obvious from text. As a result, if different words appear in similar images, then these words likely describe the same thing. Conversely, if a word is used to describe seemingly dissimilar images, then these images may represent the same object. Thus, in cases dealing with multi-modal data, it is important to use a model which is able to jointly represent the information such that the model can capture the combined information from different modalities.

== Multimodal transformers ==
Multimodality means having multiple modalities, where a "modality" refers to a type of input or output, such as video, image, audio, text, proprioception, etc. For example, Google PaLM model was fine-tuned into a multimodal model and applied to robotic control. LLaMA models have also been turned multimodal using the tokenization method, to allow image inputs, and video inputs. GPT-4o can process and generate text, audio and images.

A common method to create multimodal models out of an LLM is to "tokenize" the output of a trained encoder. Concretely, one can construct an LLM that can understand images as follows: take a trained LLM, and take a trained image encoder $E$. Make a small multilayer perceptron $f$, so that for any image $y$, the post-processed vector $f(E(y))$ has the same dimensions as an encoded token. That is an "image token". Then, one can interleave text tokens and image tokens. The compound model is then fine-tuned on an image-text dataset. This basic construction can be applied with more sophistication to improve the model. The image encoder may be frozen to improve stability. This type of method, where embeddings from multiple modalities are fused and the predictor is trained on the combined embeddings, is called early fusion.

Another method, called intermediate fusion, involves each modality being first processed independently to obtain modality-specific representations; then these intermediate representations are fused together. In general, cross-attention is used for integrating information from different modalities. As an example, the Flamingo model uses cross-attention layers to inject visual information into its pre-trained language model.

Transformers can also be used/adapted for modalities (input or output) beyond just text, usually by finding a way to "tokenize" the modality.

Multimodal models can either be trained from scratch, or by finetuning. A 2022 study found that transformers pretrained only on natural language can be finetuned on only 0.03% of parameters and become competitive with LSTMs on a variety of logical and visual tasks, demonstrating transfer learning. LLaVA was a vision-language model composed of a language model (Vicuna-13B) and a vision model (ViT-L/14), connected by a learned projection layer. In its first training stage, the projection layer was trained while the vision encoder and language model were frozen; in the later visual-instruction-tuning stage, the vision encoder remained frozen while the projection layer and language model were fine-tuned.

Vision transformers adapt the transformer to computer vision by breaking down input images as a series of patches, turning them into vectors, and treating them like embedding vectors of tokens in a standard transformer.

Conformer combines self-attention with convolution modules to model both global and local patterns in speech. Whisper converts audio to log-Mel spectrogram features and processes them with convolutional layers and an encoder–decoder Transformer; it does not divide spectrograms into image-style patches.

Perceivers are a variant of transformers designed for multimodality.

For image generation, notable architectures are DALL-E 1 (2021), Parti (2022), Phenaki (2023), and Muse (2023). Unlike later models, DALL-E is not a diffusion model. Instead, it uses a decoder-only transformer that autoregressively generates a text, followed by the token representation of an image, which is then decoded by a discrete variational autoencoder (dVAE) into an image. Parti is an encoder–decoder transformer, where the encoder processes a text prompt, and the decoder generates a token representation of an image. Muse is an encoder-only transformer that is trained to predict masked image tokens from unmasked image tokens. During generation, all input tokens are masked, and the highest-confidence predictions are included for the next iteration, until all tokens are predicted. Phenaki is a text-to-video model. It is a bidirectional masked transformer conditioned on pre-computed text tokens. The generated tokens are then decoded to a video.

Models such as CLIP (Contrastive Language–Image Pretraining) learn joint representations of images and text by optimizing contrastive objectives, allowing the model to match images with their corresponding textual descriptions.

== Multimodal deep Boltzmann machines ==
A Boltzmann machine is a type of stochastic neural network invented by Geoffrey Hinton and Terry Sejnowski in 1985. Boltzmann machines can be seen as the stochastic, generative counterpart of Hopfield nets. They are named after the Boltzmann distribution in statistical mechanics. The units in Boltzmann machines are divided into two groups: visible units and hidden units. Each unit is like a neuron with a binary output that represents whether it is activated or not. General Boltzmann machines allow connection between any units. However, learning is impractical using general Boltzmann Machines because the computational time is exponential to the size of the machine. A more efficient architecture is called restricted Boltzmann machine where connection is only allowed between hidden unit and visible unit, which is described in the next section.

Multimodal deep Boltzmann machines can process and learn from different types of information, such as images and text, simultaneously. This can notably be done by having a separate deep Boltzmann machine for each modality, for example one for images and one for text, joined at an additional top hidden layer.

== Applications ==
Multimodal machine learning has numerous applications across various domains:

- Cross-modal retrieval: cross-modal retrieval allows users to search for data across different modalities (e.g., retrieving images based on text descriptions), improving multimedia search engines and content recommendation systems.
- Classification and missing data retrieval: multimodal Deep Boltzmann Machines outperform traditional models like support vector machines and latent Dirichlet allocation in classification tasks and can predict missing data in multimodal datasets, such as images and text.
- Healthcare diagnostics: multimodal models integrate medical imaging, genomic data, and patient records to improve diagnostic accuracy and early disease detection, especially in cancer screening.
- Content generation: models like DALL·E generate images from textual descriptions, benefiting creative industries, while cross-modal retrieval enables dynamic multimedia searches.
- Robotics and human-computer interaction: multimodal learning improves interaction in robotics and AI by integrating sensory inputs like speech, vision, and touch, aiding autonomous systems and human-computer interaction.
- Emotion recognition: combining visual, audio, and text data, multimodal systems enhance sentiment analysis and emotion recognition, applied in customer service, social media, and marketing.
- Code search: multimodal representations combining source code structure (e.g., abstract syntax trees) with natural language descriptions improve retrieval of relevant code snippets for a given query. Source code has also been rendered as a two-dimensional pixel image, for instance by converting a method's control-flow graph into a black-and-white image processed with a convolutional neural network to search for malwares.

== Challenges ==
Multimodal learning is challenging because different modalities can represent and structure information in different ways. Two common challenges are alignment, determining which parts of different modalities correspond to each other, and fusion, determining how information across modalities should be combined. Real-world applications of multimodal learning face further challenges specific to multimodal AI, including missing modalities when a data source is unavailable, selecting modalities that provide complementary rather than redundant information, and privacy risks from combining data sources, which may allow individuals to be re-identified even if they are anonymous in each source separately.

== See also ==
- Cross-modal retrieval
- Vision-language model
- Hopfield network
- Markov random field
- Markov chain Monte Carlo
- SGLang
