= Cluster =

Cluster(s) may refer to:

== Science and technology ==
=== Astronomy ===
- Cluster (spacecraft), constellation of four European Space Agency spacecraft
- Cluster II (spacecraft), a European Space Agency mission to study the magnetosphere
- Asteroid cluster, a small asteroid family
- Galaxy cluster, the largest gravitationally bound groups of galaxies, or groups of groups of galaxies
- Supercluster, large spherical formations in the universe, composed of many galaxy clusters
- Star cluster
  - Globular cluster, a spherical collection of stars whose orbit is either partially or completely in the halo of the parent galaxy
  - Open cluster, a spherical collection of stars that orbits a galaxy in the galactic plane

=== Biology and medicine ===
- Cancer cluster, in biomedicine, an occurrence of a greater-than-expected number of cancer cases
- Cluster headache, a neurological disease that involves an immense degree of pain
- Cluster of differentiation, protocol used for the identification and investigation of cell surface molecules present on white blood cells
- Winter cluster, in beekeeping, a well-defined cluster of honey bees in cold temperatures
- Disease cluster, a grouping of cases of disease
- Gene cluster, a group of genes (or proteins, or metabolites) whose expression or concentration is similar across a range of conditions
- Cluster of microorganisms, as in a colony

=== Chemistry ===
- Cluster chemistry, an array of bound atoms intermediate in character between a molecule and a solid

=== Computer science ===
- Computer cluster, a set of computers that work together
- Data cluster, a group of disk sectors used in a File Allocation Table

=== Economics ===
- Business cluster, a geographic cluster of competitive businesses
- Cluster theory, a theory that states concentrating industries in specific regions creates several advantages

=== Education ===
- CLUSTER, the Consortium Linking Universities of Science and Technology for Education and Research (a collection of twelve European universities which focus on science and engineering)

=== Equipment ===
- Cluster bomb, a type of air-dropped or ground-launched shells
- Instrument cluster of an automobile
- A bicycle cogset, either a freewheel, or cassette
- The set of tubes attached to a cow's teats for automatic milking

=== Linguistics ===
- Consonant cluster, a group of consonants which have no intervening vowel
- Language cluster or dialect cluster, a geographic distribution of languages

=== Math and statistics ===
- Cluster prime, a type of prime number
- Cluster analysis, a set of techniques for grouping a set of objects based on intrinsic similarities
- Cluster sampling, a sampling technique used when "natural" groupings are evident in a statistical population
- Cluster graph, in graph theory, a disjoint union of complete graphs
- Clusterable graph, in balance theory
- Cluster algebra, a class of commutative rings used in representation theory
- Cluster expansion, a technique in statistical mechanics and quantum field theory

=== Physics ===
- Cluster (physics), a small group of atoms or molecules

=== Urban development ===
- Cluster home, a type of housing development
- Research-intensive cluster, a region with a high density of research-oriented organizations
- Urban agglomeration, a cluster concept in urban development (a human settlement with a high population density and an infrastructure of built environment)

== Philosophy and religion ==
- Khandha, a Buddhist concept of five material and mental factors that take part in the rise of craving and clinging
- Proper name (philosophy), a cluster of propositions that in combination pick out a unique referent

== Arts and media ==
=== Music ===
- Tone cluster, a musical chord comprising at least three consecutive tones in a scale
- Cluster (album), the 1971 eponymous album by the band Cluster
- Cluster (band), a German electronic group
- "Cluster", a track from the album Ben Bu Sarkiyi Sana Yazdim by Cem Adrian
- "Cluster", a song by P-Model from the album Big Body
- Cluster One, the first track on Pink Floyd's 1994 album The Division Bell
- "Cluster", an extended play by the pop-punk band Waterparks

=== Other media ===
- Cluster (novels) by Piers Anthony
- Cluster, a poetry collection by Souvankham Thammavongsa
- The Cluster, a character from the TV series Steven Universe

== Other uses ==
- Cluster, Pleasants County, West Virginia
- Cluster diagram, general type of diagram, which represents some kind of cluster
- Clusterfuck or cluster, slang term for a messy situation, arising in the US Marine Corps

== See also ==
- Clustering (disambiguation)
