= Cross-modal retrieval =

Obtaining information resources relevant to an information need across modalities

Cross-modal retrieval is a subfield of information retrieval that enables users to search for and retrieve information across different data modalities, such as text, images, audio, and video. Unlike traditional information retrieval systems that match queries and documents within the same modality (e.g., text-to-text search), cross-modal retrieval bridges different types of media to facilitate more flexible information access.

== Overview ==
Cross-modal retrieval addresses scenarios where the query and target documents are of different types. Common applications include:

- Text-to-image retrieval: searching for images using text descriptions
- Image-to-text retrieval: finding relevant text documents or captions using an image query
- Audio-to-video retrieval: locating video content based on audio characteristics
- Video-to-text retrieval: retrieving textual descriptions or documents related to video content

== Technical challenges ==
Cross-modal retrieval presents several challenges:

- Semantic gap: Different modalities represent information in different ways. Text uses discrete symbolic representations, while images consist of continuous pixel values and audio uses spectral features. Establishing meaningful semantic correspondences across these heterogeneous representations is a main challenge.
- Feature heterogeneity: Each modality has distinct low-level features and structural properties, making direct comparison or matching difficult without appropriate transformation or mapping techniques.

== Approaches ==
Modern cross-modal retrieval systems employ various techniques:

- Common representation learning: The most prevalent approach involves learning a shared embedding space where items from different modalities are projected. In this space, semantically similar items are positioned close together regardless of their original modality, enabling similarity-based retrieval.
- Neural network architectures: Deep learning models, particularly vision-language transformers and contrastive learning frameworks can learn joint representations from large-scale multi-modal datasets.
- Cross-modal attention mechanisms: Architectures incorporate attention mechanisms that allow the system to focus on relevant parts of one modality when processing information from another.

== Applications ==
Cross-modal retrieval has numerous practical applications including:

- Multimedia search engines
- Content-based recommendation systems
- Medical image retrieval using clinical text
- Digital library systems
- E-commerce product search
- Social media content discovery

== See also ==
- Information retrieval
- Multimodal learning
- Computer vision
- Natural language processing
- Content-based image retrieval
