= Legal information retrieval =

Techniques for searching legal texts

Legal information retrieval is the science of information retrieval applied to legal text, including legislation, case law, and scholarly works. Accurate legal information retrieval is important to provide access to the law to laymen and legal professionals. Its importance has increased because of the vast and quickly increasing amount of legal documents available through electronic means. Legal information retrieval is a part of the growing field of legal informatics.

In a legal setting, it is frequently important to retrieve all information related to a specific query. However, commonly used boolean search methods (exact matches of specified terms) on full text legal documents have been shown to have an average recall rate as low as 20 percent, meaning that only 1 in 5 relevant documents are actually retrieved. In that case, researchers believed that they had retrieved over 75% of relevant documents. This may result in failing to retrieve important or precedential cases. In some jurisdictions this may be especially problematic, as legal professionals are ethically obligated to be reasonably informed as to relevant legal documents.

Legal Information Retrieval attempts to increase the effectiveness of legal searches by increasing the number of relevant documents (providing a high recall rate) and reducing the number of irrelevant documents (a high precision rate). This is a difficult task, as the legal field is prone to jargon, polysemes (words that have different meanings when used in a legal context), and constant change.

Techniques used to achieve these goals generally fall into three categories: boolean retrieval, manual classification of legal text, and natural language processing of legal text.

== Problems ==
Application of standard information retrieval techniques to legal text can be more difficult than application in other subjects. One key problem is that the law rarely has an inherent taxonomy. Instead, the law is generally filled with open-ended terms, which may change over time. This can be especially true in common law countries, where each decided case can subtly change the meaning of a certain word or phrase.

Legal information systems must also be programmed to deal with law-specific words and phrases. Though this is less problematic in the context of words which exist solely in law, legal texts also frequently use polysemes, words may have different meanings when used in a legal or common-speech manner, potentially both within the same document. The legal meanings may be dependent on the area of law in which it is applied. For example, in the context of European Union legislation, the term "worker" has four different meanings:

1. Any worker as defined in Article 3(a) of Directive 89/391/EEC who habitually uses display screen equipment as a significant part of his normal work.
2. Any person employed by an employer, including trainees and apprentices but excluding domestic servants;
3. Any person carrying out an occupation on board a vessel, including trainees and apprentices, but excluding port pilots and shore personnel carrying out work on board a vessel at the quayside;
4. Any person who, in the Member State concerned, is protected as an employee under national employment law and in accordance with national practice;

It also has the common meaning:

5. A person who works at a specific occupation.

Though the terms may be similar, correct information retrieval must differentiate between the intended use and irrelevant uses in order to return the correct results.

Even if a system overcomes the language problems inherent in law, it must still determine the relevancy of each result. In the context of judicial decisions, this requires determining the precedential value of the case. Case decisions from senior or superior courts may be more relevant than those from lower courts, even where the lower court's decision contains more discussion of the relevant facts. The opposite may be true, however, if the senior court has only a minor discussion of the topic (for example, if it is a secondary consideration in the case). An information retrieval system must also be aware of the authority of the jurisdiction. A case from a binding authority is most likely of more value than one from a non-binding authority.

Additionally, the intentions of the user may determine which cases they find valuable. For instance, where a legal professional is attempting to argue a specific interpretation of law, he might find a minor court's decision which supports his position more valuable than a senior courts position which does not. He may also value similar positions from different areas of law, different jurisdictions, or dissenting opinions.

Overcoming these problems can be made more difficult because of the large number of cases available. The number of legal cases available via electronic means is constantly increasing (in 2003, US appellate courts handed down approximately 500 new cases per day), meaning that an accurate legal information retrieval system must incorporate methods of both sorting past data and managing new data.

== Techniques ==
=== Boolean searches ===
Boolean searches, where a user may specify terms such as use of specific words or judgments by a specific court, are the most common type of search available via legal information retrieval systems. They are widely implemented but overcome few of the problems discussed above.

The recall and precision rates of these searches vary depending on the implementation and searches analyzed. One study found a basic boolean search's recall rate to be roughly 20%, and its precision rate to be roughly 79%. Another study implemented a generic search (that is, not designed for legal uses) and found a recall rate of 56% and a precision rate of 72% among legal professionals. Both numbers increased when searches were run by non-legal professionals, to a 68% recall rate and 77% precision rate. This is likely explained because of the use of complex legal terms by the legal professionals.

=== Manual classification ===
In order to overcome the limits of basic boolean searches, information systems have attempted to classify case laws and statutes into more computer friendly structures. Usually, this results in the creation of an ontology to classify the texts, based on the way a legal professional might think about them. These attempt to link texts on the basis of their type, their value, and/or their topic areas. Most major legal search providers now implement some sort of classification search, such as Westlaw's “Natural Language” or LexisNexis' Headnote searches. Additionally, both of these services allow browsing of their classifications, via Westlaw's West Key Numbers or Lexis' Headnotes. Though these two search algorithms are proprietary and secret, it is known that they employ manual classification of text (though this may be computer-assisted).

These systems can help overcome the majority of problems inherent in legal information retrieval systems, in that manual classification has the greatest chances of identifying landmark cases and understanding the issues that arise in the text. In one study, ontological searching resulted in a precision rate of 82% and a recall rate of 97% among legal professionals. The legal texts included, however, were carefully controlled to just a few areas of law in a specific jurisdiction.

The major drawback to this approach is the requirement of using highly skilled legal professionals and large amounts of time to classify texts. As the amount of text available continues to increase, some have stated their belief that manual classification is unsustainable.

=== Natural language processing ===
In order to reduce the reliance on legal professionals and the amount of time needed, efforts have been made to create a system to automatically classify legal text and queries. Adequate translation of both would allow accurate information retrieval without the high cost of human classification. These automatic systems generally employ Natural Language Processing (NLP) techniques that are adapted to the legal domain, and also require the creation of a legal ontology. Though multiple systems have been postulated, few have reported results. One system, “SMILE,” which attempted to automatically extract classifications from case texts, resulted in an f-measure (which is a calculation of both recall rate and precision) of under 0.3 (compared to perfect f-measure of 1.0). This is probably much lower than an acceptable rate for general usage.

Despite the limited results, many theorists predict that the evolution of such systems will eventually replace manual classification systems.

=== Citation-Based ranking ===
In the mid-90s the Room 5 case law retrieval project used citation mining for summaries and ranked its search results based on citation type and count. This slightly pre-dated the PageRank algorithm at Stanford which was also a citation-based ranking. Ranking of results was based as much on jurisdiction as on number of references.

== See also ==
- Computer-assisted legal research
