= Web query =

Query entered into a web search engine

A web query or web search query is a query that a user enters into a web search engine to satisfy their information needs. Web search queries are distinctive in that they are often plain text and boolean search directives are rarely used. They vary greatly from standard query languages, which are governed by strict syntax rules as command languages with keyword or positional parameters.

== Types ==
There are three broad categories that cover most web search queries: informational, navigational, and transactional. These are also called "do, know, go." Although this model of searching was not theoretically derived, the classification has been empirically validated with actual search engine queries.

- Informational queries – Queries that cover a broad topic (e.g., colorado or trucks) for which there may be thousands of relevant results.
- Navigational queries – Queries that seek a single website or web page of a single entity (e.g., youtube or delta air lines).
- Transactional queries – Queries that reflect the intent of the user to perform a particular action, like purchasing a car or downloading a screen saver.

Search engines often support a fourth type of query that is used far less frequently:

- Connectivity queries – Queries that report on the connectivity of the indexed web graph (e.g., Which links point to this URL?, and How many pages are indexed from this domain name?).

== Characteristics ==
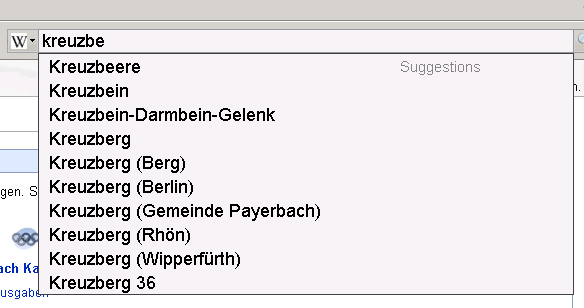
A list of search suggestions for a search query

Most commercial web search engines do not disclose their search logs, so information about what users are searching for on the Web is difficult to come by. Nevertheless, research studies started to appear in 1998. A 2001 study, which analyzed the queries from the Excite search engine, showed some interesting characteristics of web searches:

- The average length of a query was 2.4 terms.
- About half of the users entered a single query while a little less than a third of users entered three or more unique queries.
- Close to half of the users examined only the first one or two pages of results (10 results per page).
- Less than 5% of users used advanced search features (e.g., boolean operators like AND, OR, and NOT).
- The top four most frequently used terms were (empty search), and, of, and sex.

A study of the same Excite query logs revealed that 19% of the queries contained a geographic term (e.g., place names, zip codes, geographic features, etc.).

Studies also show that, in addition to short queries (queries with few terms), there are predictable patterns of how users change their queries.

A 2005 study of Yahoo's query logs revealed that 33% of the queries from the same users were repeat queries and that in 87% of cases the user would click on the same result. This suggests that many users use repeat queries to revisit or re-find information. This analysis is confirmed by a Bing search engine blog post which stated that about 30% of queries are navigational queries.

In addition, research has shown that query term frequency distributions conform to the power law, or long tail distribution curves. That is, a small portion of the terms observed in a large query log (e.g. > 100 million queries) are used most often, while the remaining terms are used less often individually. This example of the Pareto principle (or 80–20 rule) allows search engines to employ optimization techniques such as index or database partitioning, caching and pre-fetching. In addition, studies have been conducted into linguistically-oriented attributes that can recognize if a web query is navigational, informational or transactional.

A 2011 study found that the average length of queries had grown steadily over time and the average length of non-English language queries had increased more than English ones. Google implemented the hummingbird update in August 2013 to handle longer search queries since more searches are conversational (e.g. "where is the nearest coffee shop?").

== Structured queries ==
With search engines that support Boolean operators and parentheses, a technique traditionally used by librarians can be applied. A user who is looking for documents that cover several topics or facets may want to describe each of them by a disjunction of characteristic words, such as vehicles OR cars OR automobiles. A faceted query is a conjunction of such facets; e.g. a query such as (electronic OR computerized OR DRE) AND (voting OR elections OR election OR balloting OR electoral) is likely to find documents about electronic voting even if they omit one of the words "electronic" or "voting", or even both.

== See also ==
- Information retrieval – Finding information for an information need
- Taxonomy for search engines
- User intent – A user's goal in making a search query
- Web query classification
- Web search engine
