= Stop word =

Common word that search engines avoid indexing to save time and space

Stop words, also spelled stopwords, are the words in a stop list (or stoplist or negative dictionary) which are filtered out ("stopped") before or after processing of natural language data (i.e. text) because they are deemed to have little semantic value or are otherwise insignificant for the task at hand. There is no single universal list of stop words used by all natural language processing (NLP) tools, nor any agreed upon rules for identifying stop words, and indeed not all tools even use such a list. Therefore, any group of words can be chosen as the stop words for a given purpose. The "general trend in [information retrieval] systems over time has been from standard use of quite large stop lists (200–300 terms) to very small stop lists (7–12 terms) to no stop list whatsoever".

== History of stop words ==
A predecessor concept was used in creating some concordances. For example, the first Hebrew concordance, Isaac Nathan ben Kalonymus's Me’ir Nativ, contained a one-page list of unindexed words, with nonsubstantive prepositions and conjunctions which are similar to common modern stop words.

Hans Peter Luhn, one of the pioneers in information retrieval, is credited with coining the phrase and using the concept when introducing his Key Word in Context automatic indexing process. The phrase "stop word", which is not in Luhn's 1959 presentation, and the associated terms "stop list" and "stoplist" appear in the literature shortly afterward.

Although it is commonly assumed that stop lists include only the most frequent words in a language, it was C.J. Van Rijsbergen who proposed the first standardized list which was not based on word frequency information. The "Van list" included 250 English words. Martin Porter's word stemming program developed in the 1980s built on the Van list, and the Porter list is now commonly used as a default stop list in a variety of software applications.

In 1990, Christopher Fox proposed the first general stop list based on empirical word frequency information derived from the Brown Corpus:

This paper reports an exercise in generating a stop list for general text based on the Brown corpus of 1,014,000 words drawn from a broad range of literature in English. We start with a list of tokens occurring more than 300 times in the Brown corpus. From this list of 278 words, 32 are culled on the grounds that they are too important as potential index terms. Twenty-six words are then added to the list in the belief that they may occur very frequently in certain kinds of literature. Finally, 149 words are added to the list because the finite state machine based filter in which this list is intended to be used is able to filter them at almost no cost. The final product is a list of 421 stop words that should be maximally efficient and effective in filtering the most frequently occurring and semantically neutral words in general literature in English.

In SEO terminology, stop words are the most common words that many search engines used to avoid for the purposes of saving space and time in processing of large data during crawling or indexing.

For some search engines, these are some of the most common, short function words, such as the, is, at, which, and on. In this case, stop words can cause problems when searching for phrases that include them, particularly in names such as "The Who", "The The", or "Take That". Other search engines remove some of the most common words—including lexical words, such as "want"—from a query in order to improve performance.

In recent years the SEO best practices around stop words have evolved along with the fields of machine learning and NLP. In February 2021, John Mueller, Webmaster Trends Analyst at Google, tweeted "I wouldn't worry about stop words at all; write naturally. Search engines look at much, much more than individual words. 'To be or not to be' just is a collection of stop words, but stop words alone don't do it any justice."

== See also ==
- Concept mining
- Filler (linguistics)
- Index (search engine)
- Information extraction
- Query expansion
- Stemming
- Text mining
