= Lemmatization =

Natural language processing canonicalisation

Lemmatization (or less commonly lemmatisation) in linguistics is the process of grouping together the inflected forms of a word so they can be analysed as a single item, identified by the word's lemma, or dictionary form.

In computational linguistics, lemmatization is the algorithmic process of determining the lemma of a word based on its intended meaning. Unlike stemming, lemmatization depends on correctly identifying the intended part of speech and meaning of a word in a sentence, as well as within the larger context surrounding that sentence, such as neighbouring sentences or even an entire document. As a result, developing efficient lemmatization algorithms is an open area of research.

== Description ==
In many languages, words appear in several inflected forms. For example, in English, the verb 'to walk' may appear as 'walk', 'walked', 'walks' or 'walking'. The base form, 'walk', that one might look up in a dictionary, is called the lemma for the word. The association of the base form with a part of speech is often called a lexeme of the word.

Lemmatization is closely related to stemming. The difference is that a stemmer operates on a single word without knowledge of the context, and therefore cannot discriminate between words which have different meanings depending on part of speech. However, stemmers are typically easier to implement and run faster. The reduced "accuracy" may not matter for some applications. In fact, when used within information retrieval systems, stemming improves query recall accuracy, or true positive rate, when compared to lemmatization. Nonetheless, stemming reduces precision, or the proportion of positively-labeled instances that are actually positive, for such systems.

For instance:

1. The word "better" has "good" as its lemma. This link is missed by stemming, as it requires a dictionary look-up.
2. The word "walk" is the base form for the word "walking", and hence this is matched in both stemming and lemmatization.
3. The word "meeting" can be either the base form of a noun or a form of a verb ("to meet") depending on the context; e.g., "in our last meeting" or "We are meeting again tomorrow". Unlike stemming, lemmatization attempts to select the correct lemma depending on the context.

Document indexing software like Lucene can store the base stemmed format of the word without the knowledge of meaning, but only considering word formation grammar rules. The stemmed word itself might not be a valid word: 'lazy', as seen in the example below, is stemmed by many stemmers to 'lazi'. This is because the purpose of stemming is not to produce the appropriate lemma – that is a more challenging task that requires knowledge of context. The main purpose of stemming is to map different forms of a word to a single form. As a rule-based algorithm, dependent only upon the spelling of a word, it sacrifices accuracy to ensure that, for example, when 'laziness' is stemmed to 'lazi', it has the same stem as 'lazy'.

== Algorithms ==
A trivial way to do lemmatization is by simple dictionary lookup. This works well for straightforward inflected forms, but a rule-based system will be needed for other cases, such as in languages with long compound words. Such rules can be either hand-crafted or learned automatically from an annotated corpus.

== Use in biomedicine ==
Morphological analysis of published biomedical literature can yield useful results. Morphological processing of biomedical text can be more effective by a specialized lemmatization program for biomedicine, and may improve the accuracy of practical information extraction tasks.

== See also ==
- Canonicalization – Process for converting data into a "standard", "normal", or canonical form
