= Martin Porter =

Martin F. Porter is the inventor of the Porter Stemmer, one of the most common algorithms for stemming English, and the Snowball programming framework. His 1980 paper "An algorithm for suffix stripping", proposing the stemming algorithm, has been cited over 8000 times (Google Scholar).

The Muscat search engine comes from research performed by Porter at the University of Cambridge and was commercialized in 1984 by Cambridge CD Publishing; it was subsequently sold to MAID which became the Dialog Corporation. Part of Dialog was then spun off to become BrightStation in 2000, which transitioned Open Muscat to a closed-source development model in 2001. Subsequently, a group of developers led by Porter initiated a project based on Open Muscat called Xapian and released the first official version on September 30, 2002.

In 2000 he was awarded the Tony Kent Strix award.

Porter read mathematics at St John's College, Cambridge (1963–66) and went to get a Diploma in Computer Science (1967) and a PhD. at Cambridge Computer Laboratory. He worked at the University of Leeds for a year before returning to Cambridge's Literary and Linguistic Computing Centre (1971-1974) and at the Sedgwick Museum as a programmer (1974-1976). In 1977, he became the Director of the Museum Documentation Advisory Unit (MDA).

Martin Porter is co-founder with John Snyder of the contextual targeting and content recommendation company, Grapeshot. John Snyder is listed as CEO and Martin Porter is listed as Chief Scientist. Grapeshot took £250,000 in UK government subsidies and subsequently raised £16m from UK investors. On May 15, 2018, Oracle Corporation completed the acquisition of Grapeshot.
