= Query expansion =

Text query method in information retrieval

Query expansion (QE) is the process of reformulating a given query to improve retrieval performance in information retrieval operations, particularly in the context of query understanding. In the context of search engines, query expansion involves evaluating a user's input (what words were typed into the search query area, and sometimes other types of data) and expanding the search query to match additional documents. Query expansion involves techniques such as:

- Finding synonyms of words, and searching for the synonyms as well
- Finding semantically related words (e.g. antonyms, meronyms, hyponyms, hypernyms)
- Finding all the various morphological forms of words by stemming each word in the search query
- Fixing spelling errors and automatically searching for the corrected form or suggesting it in the results
- Re-weighting the terms in the original query

Query expansion is a methodology studied in the field of computer science, particularly within the realm of natural language processing and information retrieval.

== Precision and recall trade-offs ==
Search engines invoke query expansion to increase the quality of user search results. It is assumed that users do not always formulate search queries using the best terms. Best in this case may be because the database does not contain the user entered terms.

By stemming a user-entered term, more documents are matched, as the alternate word forms for a user entered term are matched as well, increasing the total recall. This comes at the expense of reducing the precision. By expanding a search query to search for the synonyms of a user entered term, the recall is also increased at the expense of precision. This is due to the nature of the equation of how precision is calculated, in that a larger recall implicitly causes a decrease in precision, given that factors of recall are part of the denominator. Furthermore, a higher recall can negatively affect the user experience, as most users perfect fewer, more relevant results rather than a large volume of loosely related ones.

The goal of query expansion in this regard is by increasing recall, precision can potentially increase (rather than decrease as mathematically equated), by including in the result set pages which are more relevant (of higher quality), or at least equally relevant. Pages which would not be included in the result set, which have the potential to be more relevant to the user's desired query, are included, and without query expansion would not have, regardless of relevance. At the same time, many of the current commercial search engines use word frequency (tf-idf) to assist in ranking. By ranking the occurrences of both the "user-entered words" and synonyms and alternate morphological forms, documents with a higher density (high frequency and close proximity) tend to migrate higher up in the search results, leading to a higher quality of the search results near the top of the results, despite the larger recall.

== Query expansion methods ==
Automatic methods for query expansion were proposed in 1960 by Maron and Kuhns. Modern query expansion methods either imply document collection analysis (global or local) or are dictionary- or ontology-based. The global analysis of the document collection is applied for searching for relations between terms. The local analysis refers to the relevance feedback introduced by Rocchio. Rocchio proposed to judge manually some of the retrieved documents and use this feedback information to expand the query. Since collecting users' judgment can be challenging, only the first top retrieved documents are considered as relevant. This is the so called pseudo-relevance feedback (PRF). Pseudo-relevance feedback is efficient in average but can damage results for some queries, especially difficult ones since the top retrieved documents are probably non-relevant. Pseudo-relevant documents are used to find expansion candidate terms that co-occur with many query terms. This idea was further developed within the relevance language model formalism in positional relevance and proximity relevance models which consider the distance to query terms in the pseudo-relevant documents. Another direction in query expansion is the representation of index and query terms in a vector space which can be used to find related terms at query time, using semantic vectors or word embeddings.

More generally, query expansion, with its counterpart document expansion, are today implemented in the form of vector databases, using various encoding schemes based on deep learning.

== See also ==
- Document retrieval
- Information retrieval
- Linguistics
- Morphology (linguistics)
- Natural language processing
- Search engine
- Search engine indexing
- Stemming

== Software libraries ==
- QueryTermAnalyzer open-source, C#. Machine learning based query term weight and synonym analyzer for query expansion.
- LucQE - open-source, Java. Provides a framework along with several implementations that allow to perform query expansion with the use of Apache Lucene.
- Xapian is an open-source search library which includes support for query expansion
- ReQue open-source, Python. A configurable software framework and a collection of gold standard datasets for training and evaluating supervised query expansion methods.
