= Information retrieval =

Finding information for an information need

In computing and information science, information retrieval (IR) is the task of identifying and retrieving information system resources that are relevant to an information need. The information need can be specified in the form of a search query. In the case of document retrieval, queries can be based on full-text or other content-based indexing. Information retrieval is the science of searching for information in a document, searching for documents themselves, and also searching for the metadata that describes data, and for databases of texts, images, or sounds. Cross-modal retrieval implies retrieval across modalities.

Automated information retrieval systems are used to reduce what has been called information overload. An IR system is a software system that provides access to books, journals, and other documents, as well as storing and managing those documents. Web search engines are the most visible IR applications.

== Overview ==
An information retrieval process begins when a user enters a query into the system. Queries are formal statements of information needs, for example search strings in web search engines. In information retrieval, a query does not uniquely identify a single object in the collection. Instead, several objects may match the query, perhaps with different degrees of relevance.

An object is an entity that is represented by information in a content collection or database. User queries are matched against the database information. However, as opposed to classical SQL queries of a database, in information retrieval the results returned may or may not match the query, so results are typically ranked. This ranking of results is a key difference of information retrieval searching compared to database searching.

Depending on the application the data objects may be, for example, text documents, images, audio, mind maps or videos. Often the documents themselves are not kept or stored directly in the IR system, but are instead represented in the system by document surrogates or metadata.

Most IR systems compute a numeric score on how well each object in the database matches the query, and rank the objects according to this value. The top ranking objects are then shown to the user. The process may then be iterated if the user wishes to refine the query.

== History ==
there is ... a machine called the Univac ... whereby letters and figures are coded as a pattern of magnetic spots on a long steel tape. By this means the text of a document, preceded by its subject code symbol, can be recorded ... the machine ... automatically selects and types out those references which have been coded in any desired way at a rate of 120 words a minute

— J. E. Holmstrom, 1948

The idea of using computers to search for relevant pieces of information was popularized in the article As We May Think by Vannevar Bush in 1945. It would appear that Bush was inspired by patents for a 'statistical machine' – filed by Emanuel Goldberg in the 1920s and 1930s – that searched for documents stored on film. The first description of a computer searching for information was described by Holmstrom in 1948, detailing an early mention of the Univac computer. Automated information retrieval systems were introduced in the 1950s: one even featured in the 1957 romantic comedy Desk Set. In the 1960s, the first large information retrieval research group was formed by Gerard Salton at Cornell. By the 1970s several different retrieval techniques had been shown to perform well on small text corpora such as the Cranfield collection (several thousand documents). Large-scale retrieval systems, such as the Lockheed Dialog system, came into use early in the 1970s.

In 1992, the US Department of Defense along with the National Institute of Standards and Technology (NIST), cosponsored the Text Retrieval Conference (TREC) as part of the TIPSTER text program. The aim of this was to look into the information retrieval community by supplying the infrastructure that was needed for evaluation of text retrieval methodologies on a very large text collection. This catalyzed research on methods that scale to huge corpora. The introduction of web search engines has boosted the need for very large scale retrieval systems even further.

By the late 1990s, the rise of the World Wide Web fundamentally transformed information retrieval. While early search engines such as AltaVista (1995) and Yahoo! (1994) offered keyword-based retrieval, they were limited in scale and ranking refinement. The breakthrough came in 1998 with the founding of Google, which introduced the PageRank algorithm, using the web's hyperlink structure to assess page importance and improve relevance ranking.

During the 2000s, web search systems evolved rapidly with the integration of machine learning techniques. These systems began to incorporate user behavior data (e.g., click-through logs), query reformulation, and content-based signals to improve search accuracy and personalization. In 2009, Microsoft launched Bing, introducing features that would later incorporate semantic web technologies through the development of its Satori knowledge base. Academic analysis have highlighted Bing's semantic capabilities, including structured data use and entity recognition, as part of a broader industry shift toward improving search relevance and understanding user intent through natural language processing.

A major leap occurred in 2018, when Google deployed BERT (Bidirectional Encoder Representations from Transformers) to better understand the contextual meaning of queries and documents. This marked one of the first times deep neural language models were used at scale in real-world retrieval systems. BERT's bidirectional training enabled a more refined comprehension of word relationships in context, improving the handling of natural language queries. Because of its success, transformer-based models gained traction in academic research and commercial search applications.

Simultaneously, the research community began exploring neural ranking models that outperformed traditional lexical-based methods. Long-standing benchmarks such as the Text REtrieval Conference (TREC), initiated in 1992, and more recent evaluation frameworks Microsoft MARCO(MAchine Reading COmprehension) (2019) became central to training and evaluating retrieval systems across multiple tasks and domains. MS MARCO has also been adopted in the TREC Deep Learning Tracks, where it serves as a core dataset for evaluating advances in neural ranking models within a standardized benchmarking environment.

As deep learning became integral to information retrieval systems, researchers began to categorize neural approaches into three broad classes: sparse, dense, and hybrid models. Sparse models, including traditional term-based methods and learned variants like SPLADE, rely on interpretable representations and inverted indexes to enable efficient exact term matching with added semantic signals. Dense models, such as dual-encoder architectures like ColBERT, use continuous vector embeddings to support semantic similarity beyond keyword overlap. Hybrid models aim to combine the advantages of both, balancing the lexical (token) precision of sparse methods with the semantic depth of dense models. This way of categorizing models balances scalability, relevance, and efficiency in retrieval systems.

As IR systems increasingly rely on deep learning, concerns around bias, fairness, and explainability have also come to the picture. Research is now focused not just on relevance and efficiency, but on transparency, accountability, and user trust in retrieval algorithms.

== Applications ==
Areas where information retrieval techniques are employed include (the entries are in alphabetical order within each category):

=== General applications ===
- Knowledge retrieval
- Multimedia information retrieval
- Cross-language information retrieval
- Cross-modal retrieval
- Digital libraries
- Information filtering
  - Recommender systems
- Media search
  - Blog search
  - Image retrieval
    - Content-based image retrieval
  - 3D retrieval
  - Music retrieval
  - News search
  - Speech retrieval
  - Video retrieval
- Search engines
  - Site search
  - Desktop search
  - Enterprise search
  - Federated search
  - Mobile search
  - Social search
  - Web search

=== Domain-specific applications ===
- Expert search finding
- Genomic information retrieval
- Geographic information retrieval
- Information retrieval for chemical structures
- Information retrieval in software engineering
- Legal information retrieval
- Vertical search

=== Other retrieval methods ===
Methods/Techniques in which information retrieval techniques are employed include:

- Cross-modal retrieval
- Adversarial information retrieval
- Automatic summarization
  - Multi-document summarization
- Compound term processing
- Cross-lingual retrieval
- Document classification
- Spam filtering
- Question answering

== Model types ==
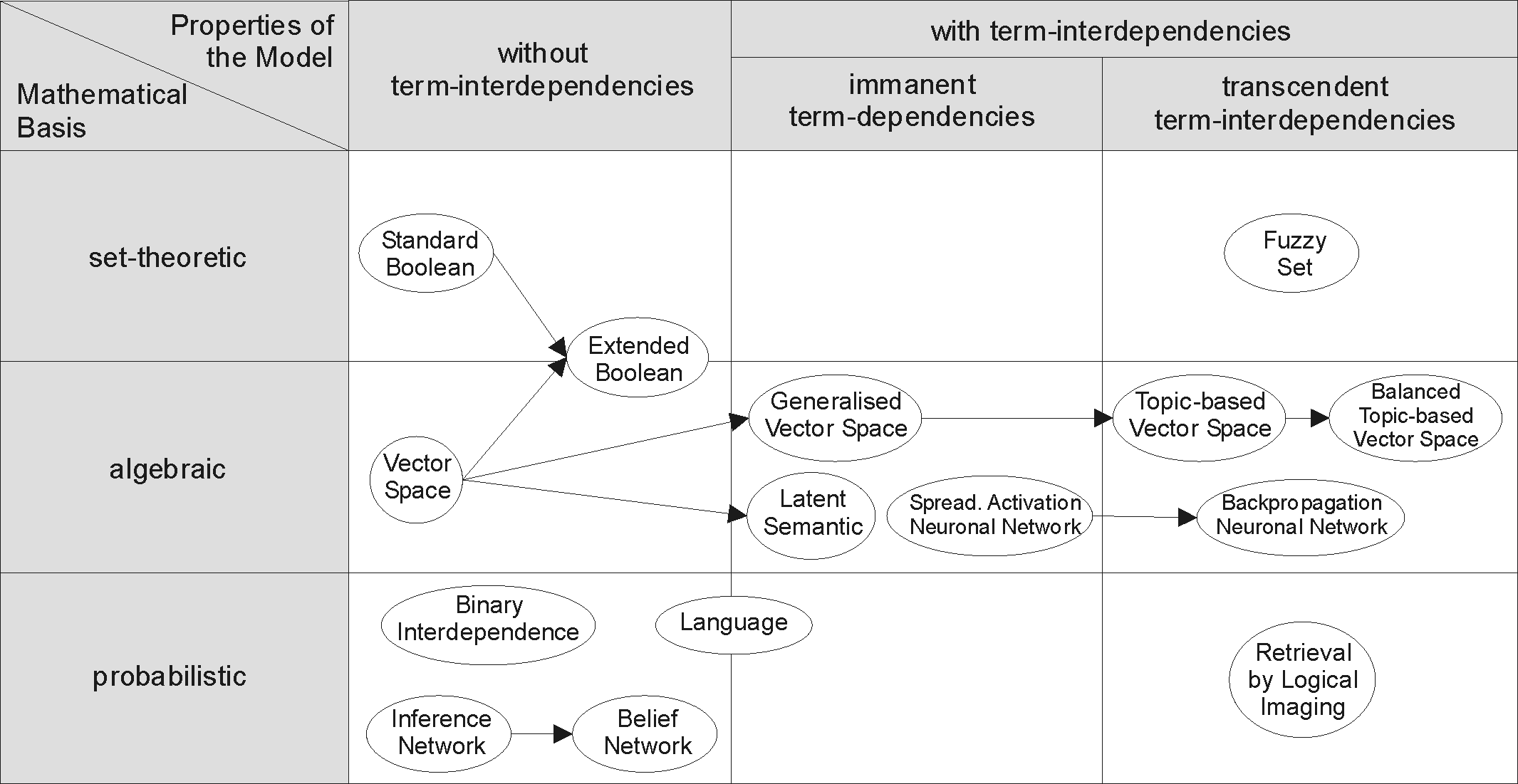
Categorization of IR-models (translated from German entry, original source Dominik Kuropka)

In order to effectively retrieve relevant documents by IR strategies, the documents are typically transformed into a suitable representation. Each retrieval strategy incorporates a specific model for its document representation purposes. The picture on the right illustrates the relationship of some common models. In the picture, the models are categorized according to two dimensions: the mathematical basis and the properties of the model.

=== First dimension: mathematical basis ===
- Set-theoretic models represent documents as sets of words or phrases. Similarities are usually derived from set-theoretic operations on those sets. Common models are:
  - Standard Boolean model
  - Extended Boolean model
  - Fuzzy retrieval
- Algebraic models represent documents and queries usually as vectors, matrices, or tuples. The similarity of the query vector and document vector is represented as a scalar value.
  - Vector space model
  - Generalized vector space model
  - (Enhanced) Topic-based Vector Space Model
  - Extended Boolean model
  - Latent semantic indexing a.k.a. latent semantic analysis
- Probabilistic models treat the process of document retrieval as a probabilistic inference. Similarities are computed as probabilities that a document is relevant for a given query. Probabilistic theorems like Bayes' theorem are often used in these models.
  - Binary Independence Model
  - Probabilistic relevance model on which is based the okapi (BM25) relevance function
  - Uncertain inference
  - Language models
  - Divergence-from-randomness model
  - Latent Dirichlet allocation
- Feature-based retrieval models view documents as vectors of values of feature functions (or just features) and seek the best way to combine these features into a single relevance score, typically by learning to rank methods. Feature functions are arbitrary functions of document and query, and as such can easily incorporate almost any other retrieval model as just another feature.
- Data fusion models: Data fusion in information retrieval combines results from multiple search systems or retrieval models to improve performance. By merging ranked lists, it leverages the strengths of diverse approaches, often enhancing recall and precision. Common methods include score normalization and voting techniques like CombSUM or Borda count. This meta-search strategy is particularly effective when individual systems have complementary coverage or when query difficulty varies, producing a more robust and reliable final ranking sparsity.

=== Second dimension: properties of the model ===
- Models without term-interdependencies treat different terms/words as independent. This fact is usually represented in vector space models by the orthogonality assumption of term vectors or in probabilistic models by an independency assumption for term variables.
- Models with immanent term interdependencies allow a representation of interdependencies between terms. However the degree of the interdependency between two terms is defined by the model itself. It is usually directly or indirectly derived (e.g. by dimensional reduction) from the co-occurrence of those terms in the whole set of documents.
- Models with transcendent term interdependencies allow a representation of interdependencies between terms, but they do not allege how the interdependency between two terms is defined. They rely on an external source for the degree of interdependency between two terms. (For example, a human or sophisticated algorithms.)

=== Third Dimension: representational approach-based classification ===
In addition to the theoretical distinctions, modern information retrieval models are also categorized on how queries and documents are represented and compared, using a practical classification distinguishing between sparse, dense and hybrid models.

- Sparse models utilize interpretable, term-based representations and typically rely on inverted index structures. Classical methods such as TF-IDF and BM25 fall under this category, along with more recent learned sparse models that integrate neural architectures while retaining sparsity.
- Dense models represent queries and documents as continuous vectors using deep learning models, typically transformer-based encoders. These models enable semantic similarity matching beyond exact term overlap and are used in tasks involving semantic search and question answering.
- Hybrid models aim to combine the strengths of both approaches, integrating lexical (tokens) and semantic signals through score fusion, late interaction, or multi-stage ranking pipelines.

This classification has become increasingly common in both academic and the real world applications and is getting widely adopted and used in evaluation benchmarks for Information Retrieval models.

== Performance and correctness measures ==
The evaluation of an information retrieval system' is the process of assessing how well a system meets the information needs of its users. In general, measurement considers a collection of documents to be searched and a search query. Traditional evaluation metrics, designed for Boolean retrieval or top-k retrieval, include precision and recall. All measures assume a ground truth notion of relevance: every document is known to be either relevant or non-relevant to a particular query. In practice, queries may be ill-posed and there may be different shades of relevance.

== Libraries for searching and indexing ==
- Lemur
- Lucene
  - Solr
  - Elasticsearch
- Manatee
- Manticore search
- Sphinx
- Terrier Search Engine
- Xapian

== Timeline ==
- Before the 1900s
  1801: Joseph Marie Jacquard invents the Jacquard loom, the first machine to use punched cards to control a sequence of operations.
  1880s: Herman Hollerith invents an electro-mechanical data tabulator using punch cards as a machine readable medium.
  1890 Hollerith cards, keypunches and tabulators used to process the 1890 US census data.
- 1920s–1930s
  Emanuel Goldberg submits patents for his "Statistical Machine", a document search engine that used photoelectric cells and pattern recognition to search the metadata on rolls of microfilmed documents.
- 1940s–1950s
  late 1940s: The US military confronted problems of indexing and retrieval of wartime scientific research documents captured from Germans.
  1945: Vannevar Bush's As We May Think appeared in Atlantic Monthly.
  1947: Hans Peter Luhn (research engineer at IBM since 1941) began work on a mechanized punch card-based system for searching chemical compounds.
  1950s: Growing concern in the US for a "science gap" with the USSR motivated, encouraged funding and provided a backdrop for mechanized literature searching systems (Allen Kent et al.) and the invention of the citation index by Eugene Garfield.
  1950: The term "information retrieval" was coined by Calvin Mooers.
  1951: Philip Bagley conducted the earliest experiment in computerized document retrieval in a master thesis at MIT.
  1955: Allen Kent joined Case Western Reserve University, and eventually became associate director of the Center for Documentation and Communications Research. That same year, Kent and colleagues published a paper in American Documentation describing the precision and recall measures as well as detailing a proposed "framework" for evaluating an IR system which included statistical sampling methods for determining the number of relevant documents not retrieved.
  1958: International Conference on Scientific Information Washington DC included consideration of IR systems as a solution to problems identified. See: Proceedings of the International Conference on Scientific Information, 1958 (National Academy of Sciences, Washington, DC, 1959)
  1959: Hans Peter Luhn published "Auto-encoding of documents for information retrieval".
- 1960s:
  early 1960s: Gerard Salton began work on IR at Harvard, later moved to Cornell.
  1960: Melvin Earl Maron and John Lary Kuhns published "On relevance, probabilistic indexing, and information retrieval" in the Journal of the ACM 7(3):216–244, July 1960.
  1962:
  * Cyril W. Cleverdon published early findings of the Cranfield studies, developing a model for IR system evaluation. See: Cyril W. Cleverdon, "Report on the Testing and Analysis of an Investigation into the Comparative Efficiency of Indexing Systems". Cranfield Collection of Aeronautics, Cranfield, England, 1962.
  * Kent published Information Analysis and Retrieval.
  1963:
  * Weinberg report "Science, Government and Information" gave a full articulation of the idea of a "crisis of scientific information". The report was named after Dr. Alvin Weinberg.
  * Joseph Becker and Robert M. Hayes published text on information retrieval. Becker, Joseph; Hayes, Robert Mayo. Information storage and retrieval: tools, elements, theories. New York, Wiley (1963).
  1964:
  * Karen Spärck Jones finished her thesis at Cambridge, Synonymy and Semantic Classification, and continued work on computational linguistics as it applies to IR.
  * The National Bureau of Standards sponsored a symposium titled "Statistical Association Methods for Mechanized Documentation". Several highly significant papers, including G. Salton's first published reference (we believe) to the SMART system.
  mid-1960s:
  * National Library of Medicine (NLM) developed MEDLARS Medical Literature Analysis and Retrieval System, the first major machine-readable database and batch-retrieval system.
  * Project Intrex at MIT.
  1965: J. C. R. Licklider published Libraries of the Future.
  1966: Don Swanson was involved in studies at University of Chicago on Requirements for Future Catalogs.
  late 1960s: F. Wilfrid Lancaster completed evaluation studies of the MEDLARS system and published the first edition of his text on information retrieval.
  1968:
  * Gerard Salton published Automatic Information Organization and Retrieval.
  * John W. Sammon, Jr.'s RADC Tech report "Some Mathematics of Information Storage and Retrieval..." outlined the vector model.
  1969: Sammon's "A nonlinear mapping for data structure analysis " (IEEE Transactions on Computers) was the first proposal for visualization interface to an IR system.
- 1970s
  early 1970s:
  * First online systems—NLM's AIM-TWX, MEDLINE; Lockheed's Dialog; SDC's ORBIT.
  * Theodor Nelson promoting concept of hypertext, published Computer Lib/Dream Machines.
  1971: Nicholas Jardine and Cornelis J. van Rijsbergen published "The use of hierarchic clustering in information retrieval", which articulated the "cluster hypothesis".
  1975: Three highly influential publications by Salton fully articulated his vector processing framework and term discrimination model:
  * A Theory of Indexing (Society for Industrial and Applied Mathematics)
  * A Theory of Term Importance in Automatic Text Analysis (JASIS v. 26)
  * A Vector Space Model for Automatic Indexing (CACM 18:11)
  1978: The First ACM SIGIR conference.
  1979: C. J. van Rijsbergen published Information Retrieval (Butterworths). Heavy emphasis on probabilistic models.
  1979: Tamas Doszkocs implemented the CITE natural language user interface for MEDLINE at the National Library of Medicine. The CITE system supported free form query input, ranked output and relevance feedback.
- 1980s
  1980: First international ACM SIGIR conference, joint with British Computer Society IR group in Cambridge.
  1982: Nicholas J. Belkin, Robert N. Oddy, and Helen M. Brooks proposed the ASK (Anomalous State of Knowledge) viewpoint for information retrieval. This was an important concept, though their automated analysis tool proved ultimately disappointing.
  1983: Salton (and Michael J. McGill) published Introduction to Modern Information Retrieval (McGraw-Hill), with heavy emphasis on vector models.
  1985: David Blair and Bill Maron publish: An Evaluation of Retrieval Effectiveness for a Full-Text Document-Retrieval System.
  1986: Donald A.B. Lindberg M.D., NLM Director, implemented a direct health professional interface to MEDLINE and other MEDLARS databases. Grateful Med, a pun on the Grateful Dead, was adapted from Microsearch, an ELHILL user interface that assembled query language prior to connecting to the NLM mainframe. After retrieving the query results, Grateful Med disconnected from the mainframe to keep search costs low.
  mid-1980s: Efforts to develop end-user versions of commercial IR systems.
  1985–1993: Key papers on and experimental systems for visualization interfaces.
  Work by Donald B. Crouch, Robert R. Korfhage, Matthew Chalmers, Anselm Spoerri and others.
  1989: First World Wide Web proposals by Tim Berners-Lee at CERN.
- 1990s
  1992: First TREC conference.
  1997: Publication of Korfhage's Information Storage and Retrieval with emphasis on visualization and multi-reference point systems.
  1998: Google is founded by Larry Page and Sergey Brin. It introduces the PageRank algorithm, which evaluates the importance of web pages based on hyperlink structure.
  1999: Publication of Ricardo Baeza-Yates and Berthier Ribeiro-Neto's Modern Information Retrieval by Addison Wesley, the first book that attempts to cover all IR.
- 2000s
  2001: Wikipedia launches as a free, collaborative online encyclopedia. It quickly becomes a major resource for information retrieval, particularly for natural language processing and semantic search benchmarks.
  2009: Microsoft launches Bing, introducing features such as related searches, semantic suggestions, and later incorporating deep learning techniques into its ranking algorithms.
- 2010s
  2013: Google's Hummingbird algorithm goes live, marking a shift from keyword matching toward understanding query intent and semantic context in search queries.
  2018: Google AI researchers release BERT (Bidirectional Encoder Representations from Transformers), enabling deep bidirectional understanding of language and improving document ranking and query understanding in IR.
  2019: Microsoft introduces MS MARCO (Microsoft MAchine Reading COmprehension), a large-scale dataset designed for training and evaluating machine reading and passage ranking models.
- 2020s
  2020: The ColBERT (Contextualized Late Interaction over BERT) model, designed for efficient passage retrieval using contextualized embeddings, was introduced at SIGIR 2020.
  2021: SPLADE is introduced at SIGIR 2021. It's a sparse neural retrieval model that balances lexical and semantic features using masked language modeling and sparsity regularization.
  2022: The BEIR benchmark is released to evaluate zero-shot IR across 18 datasets covering diverse tasks. It standardizes comparisons between dense, sparse, and hybrid IR models.

== Major conferences ==
- SIGIR: Special Interest Group on Information Retrieval
- ECIR: European Conference on Information Retrieval
- CIKM: Conference on Information and Knowledge Management
- WWW: International World Wide Web Conference

== Awards in the field ==
- Tony Kent Strix award
- Gerard Salton Award
- Karen Spärck Jones Award

== See also ==
- Adversarial information retrieval – Information retrieval strategies in datasets
- Computer memory – Component that stores information
- Controlled vocabulary – Method of organizing knowledge
- Data mining – Process of analyzing large data sets
- Data retrieval – Way to obtain data from a database
- Human–computer information retrieval (HCIR)
- Information extraction – Machine reading of unstructured documents
- Information seeking – Type of activity in information science
  - Information seeking § Compared to information retrieval
  - Collaborative information seeking
  - Social information seeking
- Information Retrieval Facility – Organization in Vienna, Austria, 2006–2012
- Knowledge visualization – Set of techniques for creating images, diagrams, or animations to communicate a message
- Personal information management – Tools and systems for managing one's own data
- Pearl growing – Type of search strategy
- Query understanding – Search engine processing step
- Relevance (information retrieval) – Measure of a document's applicability to a given subject or search query
- Relevance feedback – Data used in information retrieval and recommendation systems
- Retrievability – Property of being able to access something
- Rocchio classification – Classification model in machine learning
- Search engine indexing – Method for data management
- Special Interest Group on Information Retrieval – Subgroup of the Association for Computing Machinery
- Subject indexing – Classifying a document by index terms
- Temporal information retrieval – Area of research related to information retrieval centered on timeliness
- tf–idf – Estimate of the importance of a word in a document
- XML retrieval – Content-based retrieval of XML documents
- Web mining – Process of analyzing large data sets
