= Learning to rank =

Use of machine learning to rank items

Learning to rank (LTR) or machine-learned ranking (MLR) is the application of machine learning, often supervised, semi-supervised or reinforcement learning, in the construction of ranking models for information retrieval and recommender systems. Training data may, for example, consist of lists of items with some partial order specified between items in each list. This order is typically induced by giving a numerical or ordinal score or a binary judgment (e.g. "relevant" or "not relevant") for each item. The goal of constructing the ranking model is to rank new, unseen lists in a similar way to rankings in the training data.

== Applications ==
=== In information retrieval ===
A possible architecture of a machine-learned search engine

Ranking is a central part of many information retrieval problems, such as document retrieval, collaborative filtering, sentiment analysis, and online advertising.

A possible architecture of a machine-learned search engine is shown in the accompanying figure.

Training data consists of queries and documents matching them together with the relevance degree of each match. It may be prepared manually by human assessors (or raters, as Google calls them), who check results for some queries and determine relevance of each result. It is not feasible to check the relevance of all documents, and so typically a technique called pooling is used — only the top few documents, retrieved by some existing ranking models are checked. This technique may introduce selection bias. Alternatively, training data may be derived automatically by analyzing clickthrough logs (i.e. search results which got clicks from users), query chains, or such search engines' features as Google's (since-replaced) SearchWiki. Clickthrough logs can be biased by the tendency of users to click on the top search results on the assumption that they are already well-ranked.

Training data is used by a learning algorithm to produce a ranking model which computes the relevance of documents for actual queries.

Typically, users expect a search query to complete in a short time (such as a few hundred milliseconds for web search), which makes it impossible to evaluate a complex ranking model on each document in the corpus, and so a two-phase scheme is used. First, a small number of potentially relevant documents are identified using simpler retrieval models which permit fast query evaluation, such as the vector space model, Boolean model, weighted AND, or BM25. This phase is called top-$k$ document retrieval and many heuristics were proposed in the literature to accelerate it, such as using a document's static quality score and tiered indexes. In the second phase, a more accurate but computationally expensive machine-learned model is used to re-rank these documents.

=== In other areas ===
Learning to rank algorithms have been applied in areas other than information retrieval:

- In machine translation for ranking a set of hypothesized translations;
- In computational biology for ranking candidate 3-D structures in protein structure prediction problems;
- In recommender systems for identifying a ranked list of related news articles to recommend to a user after he or she has read a current news article.

== Feature vectors ==
For the convenience of MLR algorithms, query-document pairs are usually represented by numerical vectors, which are called feature vectors. Such an approach is sometimes called bag of features and is analogous to the bag of words model and vector space model used in information retrieval for representation of documents.

Components of such vectors are called features, factors or ranking signals. They may be divided into three groups (features from document retrieval are shown as examples):

- Query-independent or static features — those features, which depend only on the document, but not on the query. For example, PageRank or document's length. Such features can be precomputed in off-line mode during indexing. They may be used to compute document's static quality score (or static rank), which is often used to speed up search query evaluation.
- Query-dependent or dynamic features — those features, which depend both on the contents of the document and the query, such as TF-IDF score or other non-machine-learned ranking functions.
- Query-level features or query features, which depend only on the query. For example, the number of words in a query.

Some examples of features, which were used in the well-known LETOR dataset:

- TF, TF-IDF, BM25, and language modeling scores of document's zones (title, body, anchors text, URL) for a given query;
- Lengths and IDF sums of document's zones;
- Document's PageRank, HITS ranks and their variants.

Selecting and designing good features is an important area in machine learning, which is called feature engineering.

== Evaluation measures ==
There are several measures (metrics) which are commonly used to judge how well an algorithm is doing on training data and to compare the performance of different MLR algorithms. Often a learning-to-rank problem is reformulated as an optimization problem with respect to one of these metrics.

Examples of ranking quality measures:

- Mean average precision (MAP);
- DCG and NDCG;
- Precision@n, NDCG@n, where "@n" denotes that the metrics are evaluated only on top n documents;
- Mean reciprocal rank;
- Kendall's tau;
- Spearman's rho.

DCG and its normalized variant NDCG are usually preferred in academic research when multiple levels of relevance are used. Other metrics such as MAP, MRR and precision, are defined only for binary judgments.

Recently, there have been proposed several new evaluation metrics which claim to model user's satisfaction with search results better than the DCG metric:

- Expected reciprocal rank (ERR);
- Yandex's pfound.

Both of these metrics are based on the assumption that the user is more likely to stop looking at search results after examining a more relevant document, than after a less relevant document.

== Approaches ==
Learning to Rank approaches are often categorized using one of three approaches: pointwise (where individual documents are ranked), pairwise (where pairs of documents are ranked into a relative order), and listwise (where an entire list of documents are ordered).

Tie-Yan Liu of Microsoft Research Asia has analyzed existing algorithms for learning to rank problems in his book Learning to Rank for Information Retrieval. He categorized them into three groups by their input spaces, output spaces, hypothesis spaces (the core function of the model) and loss functions: the pointwise, pairwise, and listwise approach. In practice, listwise approaches often outperform pairwise approaches and pointwise approaches. This statement was further supported by a large scale experiment on the performance of different learning-to-rank methods on a large collection of benchmark data sets.

In this section, without further notice, $x$ denotes an object to be evaluated, for example, a document or an image, $f(x)$ denotes a single-value hypothesis, $h(\cdot)$ denotes a bi-variate or multi-variate function and $L(\cdot)$ denotes the loss function.

=== Pointwise approach ===
In this case, it is assumed that each query-document pair in the training data has a numerical or ordinal score. Then the learning-to-rank problem can be approximated by a regression problem — given a single query-document pair, predict its score. Formally speaking, the pointwise approach aims at learning a function $f(x)$ predicting the real-value or ordinal score of a document $x$ using the loss function $L(f; x_j, y_j)$.

A number of existing supervised machine learning algorithms can be readily used for this purpose. Ordinal regression and classification algorithms can also be used in pointwise approach when they are used to predict the score of a single query-document pair, and it takes a small, finite number of values.

=== Pairwise approach ===
In this case, the learning-to-rank problem is approximated by a classification problem — learning a binary classifier $h(x_u, x_v)$ that can tell which document is better in a given pair of documents. The classifier shall take two documents as its input and the goal is to minimize a loss function $L(h; x_u, x_v, y_{u,v})$. The loss function typically reflects the number and magnitude of inversions in the induced ranking.

In many cases, the binary classifier $h(x_u, x_v)$ is implemented with a scoring function $f(x)$. As an example, RankNet adapts a probability model and defines $h(x_u, x_v)$ as the estimated probability of the document $x_u$ has higher quality than $x_v$:

$$P_{u, v}(f) =
\text{CDF} (f(x_u) - f(x_v)),$$

where $\text{CDF}(\cdot)$ is a cumulative distribution function, for example, the standard logistic CDF, i.e.

$$\text{CDF}(x)
=
\frac{
1
}{
1 + \exp\left[ - x \right]
}.$$

=== Listwise approach ===
These algorithms try to directly optimize the value of one of the above evaluation measures, averaged over all queries in the training data. This is often difficult in practice because most evaluation measures are not continuous functions with respect to ranking model's parameters, and so continuous approximations or bounds on evaluation measures have to be used. For example the SoftRank algorithm. LambdaMART is a pairwise algorithm which has been empirically shown to approximate listwise objective functions.

=== List of methods ===
A partial list of published learning-to-rank algorithms is shown below with years of first publication of each method:

Year	Name	Type	Notes
1989	OPRF	pointwise	Polynomial regression (instead of machine learning, this work refers to pattern recognition, but the idea is the same).
1992	SLR	pointwise	Staged logistic regression.
1994	NMOpt	listwise	Non-Metric Optimization.
1999	MART (Multiple Additive Regression Trees)	pairwise	
2000	Ranking SVM (RankSVM)	pairwise	A more recent exposition is in, which describes an application to ranking using clickthrough logs.
2001	Pranking	pointwise	Ordinal regression.
2003	RankBoost	pairwise	
2005	RankNet	pairwise	
2006	IR-SVM	pairwise	Ranking SVM with query-level normalization in the loss function.
2006	LambdaRank	pairwise/listwise	RankNet in which pairwise loss function is multiplied by the change in the IR metric caused by a swap.
2007	AdaRank	listwise	
2007	FRank	pairwise	Based on RankNet, uses a different loss function - fidelity loss.
2007	GBRank	pairwise	
2007	ListNet	listwise	
2007	McRank	pointwise	
2007	QBRank	pairwise	
2007	RankCosine	listwise	
2007	RankGP	listwise	
2007	RankRLS	pairwise	Regularized least-squares based ranking. The work is extended in to learning to rank from general preference graphs.
2007	SVM^{map}	listwise	
2008	LambdaSMART/LambdaMART	pairwise/listwise	Winning entry in the Yahoo Learning to Rank competition in 2010, using an ensemble of LambdaMART models. Based on MART (1999) “LambdaSMART”, for Lambda-submodel-MART, or LambdaMART for the case with no submodel.
2008	ListMLE	listwise	Based on ListNet.
2008	PermuRank	listwise	
2008	SoftRank	listwise	
2008	Ranking Refinement	pairwise	A semi-supervised approach to learning to rank that uses Boosting.
2008	SSRankBoost	pairwise	An extension of RankBoost to learn with partially labeled data (semi-supervised learning to rank).
2008	SortNet	pairwise	SortNet, an adaptive ranking algorithm which orders objects using a neural network as a comparator.
2009	MPBoost	pairwise	Magnitude-preserving variant of RankBoost. The idea is that the more unequal are labels of a pair of documents, the harder should the algorithm try to rank them.
2009	BoltzRank	listwise	Unlike earlier methods, BoltzRank produces a ranking model that looks during query time not just at a single document, but also at pairs of documents.
2009	BayesRank	listwise	A method combines Plackett-Luce model and neural network to minimize the expected Bayes risk, related to NDCG, from the decision-making aspect.
2010	NDCG Boost	listwise	A boosting approach to optimize NDCG.
2010	GBlend	pairwise	Extends GBRank to the learning-to-blend problem of jointly solving multiple learning-to-rank problems with some shared features.
2010	IntervalRank	pairwise & listwise	
2010	CRR	pointwise & pairwise	Combined Regression and Ranking. Uses stochastic gradient descent to optimize a linear combination of a pointwise quadratic loss and a pairwise hinge loss from Ranking SVM.
2014	LCR	pairwise	Applied local low-rank assumption on collaborative ranking. Received best student paper award at WWW'14.
2015	FaceNet	pairwise	Ranks face images with the triplet metric via deep convolutional network.
2016	XGBoost	pairwise	Supports various ranking objectives and evaluation metrics.
2017	ES-Rank	listwise	Evolutionary Strategy Learning to Rank technique with 7 fitness evaluation metrics.
2018	DLCM	listwise	A multi-variate ranking function that encodes multiple items from an initial ranked list (local context) with a recurrent neural network and create result ranking accordingly.
2018	PolyRank	pairwise	Learns simultaneously the ranking and the underlying generative model from pairwise comparisons.
2018	FATE-Net/FETA-Net	listwise	End-to-end trainable architectures, which explicitly take all items into account to model context effects.
2019	FastAP	listwise	Optimizes Average Precision to learn deep embeddings.
2019	Mulberry	listwise & hybrid	Learns ranking policies maximizing multiple metrics across the entire dataset.
2019	DirectRanker	pairwise	Generalisation of the RankNet architecture.
2019	GSF	listwise	A permutation-invariant multi-variate ranking function that encodes and ranks items with groupwise scoring functions built with deep neural networks.
2020	RaMBO	listwise	Optimizes rank-based metrics using blackbox backpropagation.
2020	PRM	pairwise	Transformer network encoding both the dependencies among items and the interactions between the user and items.
2020	SetRank	listwise	A permutation-invariant multi-variate ranking function that encodes and ranks items with self-attention networks.
2021	PiRank	listwise	Differentiable surrogates for ranking able to exactly recover the desired metrics and scales favourably to large list sizes, significantly improving internet-scale benchmarks.
2022	SAS-Rank	listwise	Combining Simulated Annealing with Evolutionary Strategy for implicit and explicit learning to rank from relevance labels.
2022	VNS-Rank	listwise	Variable Neighborhood Search in 2 Novel Methodologies in AI for Learning to Rank.
2022	VNA-Rank	listwise	Combining Simulated Annealing with Variable Neighbourhood Search for Learning to Rank.
2023	GVN-Rank	listwise	Combining Gradient Ascent with Variable Neighbourhood Search for Learning to Rank.
2025	zELO	pairwise & pointwise	Using pairwise judgements and a Bradley–Terry model to calculate pointwise scores, analogous to Elo ranking.

Note: as most supervised learning-to-rank algorithms can be applied to pointwise, pairwise and listwise case, only those methods which are specifically designed with ranking in mind are shown above.

== History ==
Norbert Fuhr introduced the general idea of MLR in 1992, describing learning approaches in information retrieval as a generalization of parameter estimation; a specific variant of this approach (using polynomial regression) had been published by him three years earlier. Bill Cooper proposed logistic regression for the same purpose in 1992 and used it with his Berkeley research group to train a successful ranking function for TREC. Manning et al. suggest that these early works achieved limited results in their time due to little available training data and poor machine learning techniques.

Several conferences, such as NeurIPS, SIGIR and ICML have had workshops devoted to the learning-to-rank problem since the mid-2000s (decade).

=== Practical usage by search engines ===
Commercial web search engines began using machine-learned ranking systems since the 2000s (decade). One of the first search engines to start using it was AltaVista (later its technology was acquired by Overture, and then Yahoo), which launched a gradient boosting-trained ranking function in April 2003.

At its launch in 2009, Microsoft Bing's search engine was powered by the RankNet algorithm, which was invented at Microsoft Research in 2005.

In November 2009 a Russian search engine Yandex announced that it had significantly increased its search quality due to deployment of a new proprietary MatrixNet algorithm, a variant of gradient boosting method which uses oblivious decision trees. Recently they have also sponsored a machine-learned ranking competition "Internet Mathematics 2009" based on their own search engine's production data. Yahoo has announced a similar competition in 2010.

As of 2008, Google's Peter Norvig denied that their search engine exclusively relies on machine-learned ranking. Cuil's CEO, Tom Costello, suggests that they prefer hand-built models because they can outperform machine-learned models when measured against metrics like click-through rate or time on landing page, which is because machine-learned models "learn what people say they like, not what people actually like".

In January 2017, the technology was included in the open source search engine Apache Solr. It is also available in the open source OpenSearch and Elasticsearch. These implementations make learning to rank widely accessible for enterprise search.

== Vulnerabilities ==
Similar to recognition applications in computer vision, recent neural network based ranking algorithms are also found to be susceptible to covert adversarial attacks, both on the candidates and the queries. With small perturbations imperceptible to human beings, ranking order could be arbitrarily altered. In addition, model-agnostic transferable adversarial examples are found to be possible, which enables black-box adversarial attacks on deep ranking systems without requiring access to their underlying implementations.

Conversely, the robustness of such ranking systems can be improved via adversarial defenses such as the Madry defense.

== See also ==
- Content-based image retrieval
- Multimedia information retrieval
- Image retrieval
- Triplet loss
