= Rocchio algorithm =

Retrieval system algorithm

The Rocchio algorithm is based on a method of relevance feedback found in information retrieval systems which stemmed from the SMART Information Retrieval System developed between 1960 and 1964. Like many other retrieval systems, the Rocchio algorithm was developed using the vector space model. Its underlying assumption is that most users have a general conception of which documents should be denoted as relevant or irrelevant. Therefore, the user's search query is revised to include an arbitrary percentage of relevant and irrelevant documents as a means of increasing the search engine's recall, and possibly the precision as well. The number of relevant and irrelevant documents allowed to enter a query is dictated by the so called weights, i.e. the variables $a$, $b$ and $c$ listed below in the Algorithm section.

== Algorithm ==
The formula and variable definitions for Rocchio relevance feedback are as follows:

$\vec{Q}_m = a \,\vec{Q}_o + b\, \frac{1}{|D_r|} \sum_{\vec{D}_j \in D_r} \vec{D}_j - c\, \frac{1}{|D_{nr}|} \sum_{\vec{D}_k \in D_{nr}} \vec{D}_k$

Variable	Value
$\vec{Q}_m$	Modified query vector
$\vec{Q}_o$	Original query vector
$\vec{D}_j$	Related document vector
$\vec{D}_k$	Non-related document vector
$a$	Original query weight
$b$	Related documents weight
$c$	Non-related documents weight
$D_r$	Set of related documents
$D_{nr}$	Set of non-related documents

As demonstrated in the formula, the associated weights ($a$, $b$, $c$) are responsible for shaping the modified vector in a direction closer, or farther away, from the original query, related documents, and non-related documents. In particular, the values for $b$ and $c$ should be incremented or decremented proportionally to the set of documents classified by the user. If the user decides that the modified query should not contain terms from either the original query, related documents, or non-related documents, then the corresponding weight ($a$, $b$, $c$) value for the category should be set to 0.

In the later part of the algorithm, the variables $D_{r}$, and $D_{nr}$ are presented to be sets of vectors containing the coordinates of related documents and non-related documents. In the formula, $\vec{D}_j$ and $\vec{D}_k$ are the vectors used to iterate through the two sets $D_{r}$ and $D_{nr}$ and form vector summations. These sums are normalized, i.e. divided by the size of their respective document set.

In order to visualize the changes taking place on the modified vector, please refer to the image below. As the weights are increased or decreased for a particular category of documents, the coordinates for the modified vector begin to move either closer, or farther away, from the centroid of the document collection. Thus if the weight is increased for related documents, then the modified vectors coordinates will reflect being closer to the centroid of related documents.

== Time complexity ==
Variable	Value
$\mathbb{D}$	Labeled document set
$L_{ave}$	Average tokens per document
$\mathbb{C}$	Class set
$V$	Vocabulary/term set
$L_{a}$	Number of tokens in document
$M_{a}$	Number of types in document

The time complexity for training and testing the algorithm are listed below and followed by the definition of each variable. Note that when in testing phase, the time complexity can be reduced to that of calculating the euclidean distance between a class centroid and the respective document. As shown by: $\Theta(\vert\mathbb{C}\vert M_{a})$.

Training = $\Theta(\vert\mathbb{D}\vert L_{ave}+\vert\mathbb{C}\vert\vert V\vert)$
Testing = $\Theta( L_{a}+\vert\mathbb{C}\vert M_{a})= \Theta(\vert\mathbb{C}\vert M_{a})$

== Usage ==
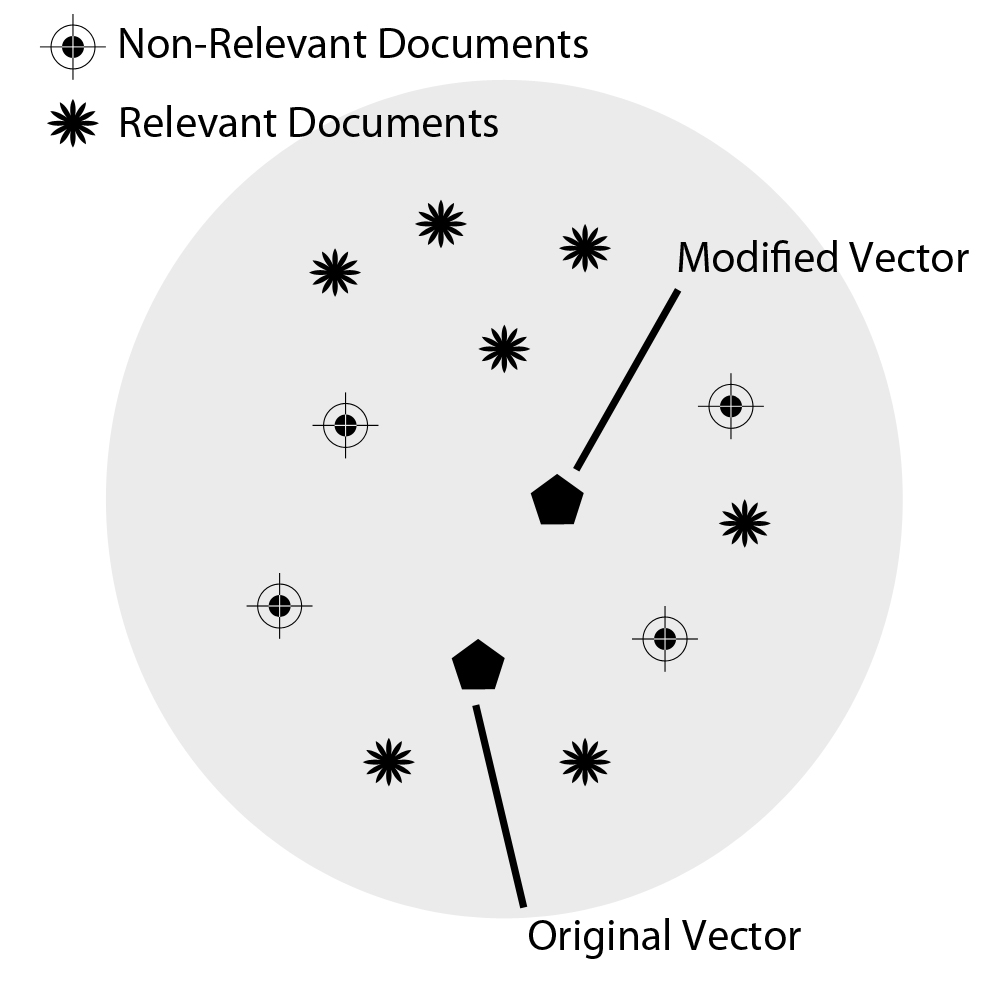
Rocchio classification

Though there are benefits to ranking documents as not-relevant, a relevant document ranking will result in more precise documents being made available to the user. Therefore, traditional values for the algorithm's weights ($a$, $b$, $c$) in Rocchio classification are typically around $a$ = 1, $b$ = 0.8, and $c$ = 0.1. Modern information retrieval systems have moved towards eliminating the non-related documents by setting c = 0 and thus only accounting for related documents. Although not all retrieval systems have eliminated the need for non-related documents, most have limited the effects on modified query by only accounting for strongest non-related documents in the $D_{nr}$ set.

== Limitations ==
The Rocchio algorithm often fails to classify multimodal classes and relationships. For instance, the country of Burma was renamed to Myanmar in 1989. Therefore, the two queries of "Burma" and "Myanmar" will appear much farther apart in the vector space model, though they both contain similar origins.

== See also ==
- Nearest centroid classifier, aka Rocchio classifier
