= Cleverdon =

Cleverdon is a surname. Notable people with the surname include:

- Cyril Cleverdon (1914–1997), British librarian and computer scientist
- Douglas Cleverdon (1903–1987), English radio producer and bookseller
- Harold Cleverdon (1904–1994), Canadian Anglican priest
- Julia Cleverdon (born 1950), British charity worker
- Scott Cleverdon (born 1969), Scottish actor
