= Yahoo Axis =

Mobile web browser

Yahoo! Axis
- Developer: Yahoo!
- Release: May 23, 2012
- Operating system: Cross-platform
- Type: Browser extension, mobile browser
- License: Proprietary
- Website: axis.yahoo.com

Yahoo Axis was a desktop web browser extension and mobile browser for iOS devices created and developed by Yahoo.

== History ==
The browser made its public debut on May 23, 2012.

A copy of the private key used to sign official Yahoo browser extensions for Google Chrome was accidentally leaked in the first public release of the Chrome extension.

On June 28, 2013, Yahoo announced the discontinuation of Axis.

== Design ==
Axis replaces the standard search results page in other browsers with a menu of search results appearing as thumbnails at the top of the page. The menu allows the user to stay on the current page without navigating away from it.

== Supported devices ==
=== Mobile browser ===
- Apple iPad
- Apple iPhone

=== Desktop browser extension ===
- Google Chrome (all versions)
- Mozilla Firefox (version 7 and higher)
- Internet Explorer (version 9 and higher)
- Apple Safari (version 5 and higher)

== See also ==
- Yahoo Toolbar
- Google Toolbar
- Bing Bar
