= Search engine evaluation =

Search engine evaluation is covered by multiple articles:

- Comparison of search engines, which is qualitative and lists the qualities of popular search engines
- Evaluation measures (information retrieval), which is quantitative and which describes general methods by which any search engine results might be evaluated
