= MRRR =

MRRR may refer to:

- Mineral Ridge Railroad, a 19th-century railroad that served several cities in the U.S. state of Michigan; see Hancock, Michigan#History
- Mount Rainier Railroad and Logging Museum, in the U.S. state of Washington
- MRRR algorithm (multiple relatively robust representations), an eigenvalue algorithm

== See also ==
- MRR (disambiguation)
