= Cumulative gain =

Cumulative gain may refer to:

- discounted cumulative gain (information retrieval).
- cumulative elevation gain (running, cycling, and mountaineering)
