= Google Sidewiki =

Web annotation tool

- Screenshot of the entries for the Wikipedia portal page.
- Original author: Google
- Developer: Google
- Release: September 23, 2009
- Operating system: Windows XP, Windows Vista, Windows 7, Linux, Mac OS X
- Platform: Google Chrome Extension, Google Toolbar, bookmarklet (Firefox, Internet Explorer, Opera, Safari)
- Available in: English
- Type: Web annotation
- Website: google.com/sidewiki

Google Sidewiki was a web annotation service from Google, launched in September 2009 and discontinued in December 2011. Sidewiki was accessible through a browser extension that allowed anyone logged into a Google Account to make and view comments about a given website in a sidebar. Despite the name, Sidewiki was not a collaborative wiki, though the comments were editable by the author.

== Function ==
Google used ranking algorithms to determine comment relevancy and usefulness, using criteria such as users voting up and down a comment and past user contributions. Anyone could look up a contributor's Google profile and assess their credibility. Caesar Sengupta of Google argued that the link to Google Profiles would help increase comment quality, because "People stop making trivial comments when it ties back to them." Website owners could "claim" their site, giving them the right to the first comment on the Sidewiki for that site. Sidewiki also linked to "relevant posts from blogs and other sources", a feature that was potentially gameable. Sidewiki was available for Internet Explorer and Firefox through Google Toolbar, and on the Google Chrome browser through an add-on. For other browsers like Safari, it was available as a third-party bookmarklet. Comments could be shared via a link, email, Twitter, or Facebook, and an API was available for developers.

== Shutdown ==
In September 2011, Google announced it would discontinue a number of its products, including Google Sidewiki.

== Reception ==
Sidewiki allowed users to interact with a website in ways that the site owner could not control, which upset some website owners. Jeff Jarvis complained that Sidewiki "takes comments away from my blog and puts them on Google. That sets up Google in channel conflict vs me. It robs my site of much of its value", and PaidContent noted that "Google is walking a fine line in its efforts to innovate in some areas that have long been the domain of traditional publishers, while not alienating them." PC Magazine commented that Sidewiki could "push site owners to make their forums more appealing on their own, and to enhance sites with no comment area with a space for reader participation." Public relations professionals saw Sidewiki as another venue that will need managing, but which offered an opportunity to engage with complaints and spot 'hot issues'. Mark Borkowski predicted that "SideWiki is going to challenge PR by providing the masses with the tool for the ultimate expression of people power, something uncontainable that will need constant monitoring... SideWiki will make it impossible to promote one message and not be held to account." ArsTechnica argued that the comments were of similar value to those on existing sites such as Digg and Reddit, and suggested that without the ability found in Wikipedia to delete and restructure material, it was a "glorified comment system".

== See also ==
- Google SearchWiki
