= List of Internet Explorer add-ons =

This is a list of add-ons for Internet Explorer, which includes extensions and toolbars. They are to be used in conjunction with Internet Explorer, and not alone, as they depend on services provided by the browser, or its accompanying Windows RSS Platform.

== Extensions ==
Name	Manufacturer/Maintainer	Description	Compatible IE version
Adblock Plus	Wladimir Palant / Eyeo GmbH	Ad-blocking	6+
Affine	Maurice Calvert	Hide unwanted sites from search engine results	6, 7
FeedsPlus	Microsoft	Feeds aggregation and notification	7
Fiddler		a HTTP debugging proxy	
Ghostery	Evidon	Privacy	9
Gofor-It for Internet Explorer	SBS Development Ltd	Adds ability to use selection-based web search	6, 7, 8
IE7pro	Daniel Fang	Tabbed browsing enhancements, ad blocking, user scripts	6, 7, 8
LuckyTabSave	LuckywarePro	Saves browsing session into file	8
Lyrics Here	Rob Wu	Adds song lyrics to YouTube and other music sites	8, 9, 10, 11
Mouse Gestures for Internet Explorer	Ralph Hare	Adds ability to use mouse gestures	6, 7, 8
MSFeedIcon	Wictor Wilén	Feeds notification and aggregation	7
Quero	Viktor Krammer	Navigation bar replacement with integrated ad blocker	6, 7, 8, 9, 10, 11
Simple Adblock	Simple Adblock	Ad-blocking	6, 7, 8, 9
Speckie	Versoworks	Spell checker	9
SpoofStick		aids defending from phishing	
Turn Off the Lights	Stefan vd	Obscures or masks content other than a running video	6, 7, 8, 9

== Toolbars ==
Name	Manufacturer/Maintainer	Description	Compatible IE version
Advanced searchbar	Advanced Search Technologies, Inc.	Search, ad-blocking, spell checking, and auto login	6, 7, 8
Alexa Toolbar		includes a popup blocker, a search engine entry box, related links and information about the Alexa ranking of the current website; Alexa uses it to measure website statistics.	
Altavista toolbar		offers search, translations, and pop-up blocker	
Data Toolbar	DataTool Services	Data Recognition and Extraction	6, 7, 8
Earthlink toolbar		offers search, phishing defense, and pop-up blocker	
IE Developer toolbar	Microsoft	Web page design and debugging. It allows the viewing of the page's source as well as of the DOM source and the CSS selectors that were applied to an element.	6, 7
Vivisimo MiniBar		offers search and pop-up blocking	

== Shells ==
Name	Manufacturer/Maintainer	Description	Compatible IE version
Maxthon		Browser, uses Trident layout engine.	6, 7
AOL Explorer	AOL	Browser, uses Trident layout engine.	6, 7
Avant Browser	Avant Force	Browser, uses Trident layout engine.	6, 7

== See also ==
- List of Firefox extensions
- Browser Helper Object
