= Automatic hyperlinking =

Software feature

An autolink is a hyperlink added automatically to a hypermedia document, after it has been authored or published. Automatic hyperlinking describes the process or the software feature that produces autolinks. Segments of the hypermedia are identified through a process of pattern matching. For example, in hypertext, the software could recognise textual patterns for street addresses, phone numbers, ISBNs, or URLs.

In a distributed hypermedia system, such as the World Wide Web, autolinking can be carried out by client or server software. For example, a web server could add links to a web page as it sends it to a web browser. A browser can also add links to a page after it has received it from the server.

== Examples ==
=== Google Toolbar ===
AutoLink was a feature of the Google Toolbar. Users could convert street addresses or ISBNs in a web page in their browser to links by clicking a button on Google Toolbar. The links directed the users to Google Maps for street addresses and Amazon.com for book information.

Since it was introduced in February 2005, there has been a lot of controversy about this feature. Some webmasters expressed their concerns over the AutoLink feature claiming that Google had no rights to modify their webpages or to direct the users to a commercial website such as Amazon.

This caused Barnes & Noble, a competitor of Amazon, to link all ISBNs on their site back to themselves to prevent people clicking them to take them to their competitor.

Google sceptics compare it with Microsoft's unpopular SmartTags, which ultimately proved too controversial and were dropped.

=== Trac Wiki Engine ===
Trac is a web application for issue tracking in software development. It has a wiki engine which is used for all text and documentation in the system. This includes not only wiki pages but also tickets and check-in log messages. These pieces of text have AutoLinks created, for example the text ticket:1 links to ticket 1. This is an example of server-side AutoLinking.

=== AutoLinker ===
AutoLinker is a plugin application which has been developed for vBulletin forum software. It allows keywords set by the board administrator to be turned into hyperlinks or popups automatically any time they are used in a forum post or message.

=== Tomboy Notes ===
Tomboy Notes is a personal wiki and text editor for Linux that creates automatic hyperlinks for web and email addresses while the text is being edited.

=== Moodle ===
The moodle online course platform uses autolinking for automatic linking of terms within a moodle site to a glossary or database entries, or to resources within the same course.

=== Saga ===
Saga is a note-taking application that creates automatic links between notes. The application recognizes page titles and headings and automatically creates links to them when they are mentioned inside notes. By using autolinks users can quickly create connected knowledge bases.

=== InLinks ===
InLinks is an online software that automates internal linking between web pages by utilizing a named entity detection algorithm to establish connections between pages containing similar entities.

== See also ==
- Entity linking
- Named entity recognition
- tf–idf
- Autocomplete
- Code folding
