= MRR =

MRR may stand for:

== Finance ==
- Monthly recurring revenue, a returning monthly income stream
- Market reference rate, e.g. Libor

== Literature and humanities ==
- Marcel Reich-Ranicki (1920–2013), German literary critic
- T.R.S. Broughton's (1900–1993), Magistrates of the Roman Republic

== Media and pop culture ==
- Maximumrocknroll, a punk zine
- My Restaurant Rules, an Australian reality show
- "Machine Robo Rescue", a Japanese mecha anime

== Online business ==
- Master Resell Right

== Roads ==
In the names of roads, Middle Ring Road:

- Kuala Lumpur Middle Ring Road 1 (Malaysia), an urban and municipal main ring road in Kuala Lumpur
- Kuala Lumpur Middle Ring Road 2 (Malaysia), a ring road connecting neighborhoods near Kuala Lumpur and Selangor
- Middle Ring Road (Tianjin) (China), a system of roads partly encircling the core of Tianjin
- Birmingham Middle ring road (A4540) in England
- Mackay Ring Road, a proposed bypass route of Mackay

== Science ==
- Mean reciprocal rank, a search quality measure in information retrieval
- Modulating retro-reflector, Free space optical communications technology

== Sport ==
- Manchester Road Race, a Thanksgiving Day race held annually since 1927

== Other ==
- José María Velasco Ibarra Airport (IATA code), an airport serving Macará, Ecuador
- Manila Railroad Company, predecessor of the Philippine National Railways
- Marine Raider Regiment, a special operations force of the United States Marine Corps
- Multi Rolle Radio (military), a modular radio set
