= Query-level feature =

A query-level feature (QLF) is a ranking feature utilized in a machine-learned ranking algorithm.

Example QLFs:

- How many times has this query been run in the last month?
- How many words are in the query?
- What is the sum/average/min/max/median of the BM25F values for the query?
