= Google Toolbar =

Discontinued web browser toolbar for Internet Explorer

- Developer: Google
- Release: December 11, 2000; 25 years ago
- Final release: 7.5.8231.2252 (Internet Explorer), 7.1.2011.0512b (Firefox) / November 21, 2016 (Internet Explorer), May 12, 2011 (Firefox)
- Operating system: Microsoft Windows
- Successor: Google Chrome
- Type: Browser toolbar
- License: Proprietary freeware
- Website: www.google.com/toolbar/ie/done.html

Google Toolbar was a web browser toolbar for Internet Explorer, developed by Google. It was first released in 2000 for Internet Explorer 5 and above. Google Toolbar was also distributed as a Mozilla plug-in for Firefox from September 2005 to June 2011. On December 12, 2021, the software was no longer available for download, and the main website now redirects to a support page.

== Features ==
Google Toolbar was located above the browser's tab bar and provided a search box for web searches. Users could log into their Gmail accounts and access their email, saved bookmarks, and web history. It had tools such as AutoLink, AutoFill, Translation, and a spell checker on all browsers. The pop-up blocker and word finder were restricted to Internet Explorer. Google Toolbar was often distributed through product bundling with a primary download.

=== Sidewiki ===
Google Sidewiki was launched on September 23, 2009, allowing users to make public comments on any web page. Google used ranking algorithms to determine comment relevancy and usefulness using criteria such as users voting up and down a comment and past contributions. Sidewiki was available for Internet Explorer and Firefox through Google Toolbar, the Google Chrome browser through an add-on, and for other browsers, like Safari, it was available as a bookmarklet.

Web site owners could not control Sidewiki comments, and there was no way for a web site to opt out of Sidewiki; however, Sidewiki was disabled on secure sites.

In September 2011, Google announced that it would discontinue Sidewiki.

=== My Location ===
My Location was a geolocation service which uses the location of Wi-Fi access points to determine the toolbar user's location. This location was used to optimize search results based on where the user was located. Google Toolbar could also provide the geolocation data to third-party websites through the W3C Geolocation API.

=== AutoLink ===
Google Toolbar was criticized when the AutoLink feature was added to the toolbar because this new feature directed users to pre-selected commercial websites. For example, if it found a book's ISBN on a webpage, it provided a link to Amazon's product page for the particular book. Google said that the feature "adds useful links" and "none of the companies which received AutoLinks had paid for the service."

=== Web caching ===
The desktop version of Google Toolbar showed the cached copy of any given search result, which was useful for slower Internet connections and benefited from Google Web Accelerator until its discontinuation in 2008. This feature does not exist for the mobile version.

Release history for desktop operating systems
Operating system		First version	Latest version	Support status
Windows
Windows	XP or later	1.1.41-deleon	7.5.8231.2252	2001–2016
Windows	2000	1.1.41-deleon	4	2000–2008
Windows	98 and Me	1.1.41-deleon	3	2000–2006
Windows	95 and NT 4.0	1.1.41-deleon	2	2000–2005
macOS
macOS	Jaguar or later	3	7	2002–2011

== Privacy ==
Google Watch has raised concerns about Google Toolbar's possible threats to privacy, such as tracking of browsing patterns, automatic installation of updates without the user's knowledge, and a privacy policy that can be revised without notice. The toolbar does not track personally identifiable surfing activities of the end user unless advanced features such as PageRank are specifically enabled by the user. It does track "anonymous" statistics, which can reveal a lot of information when correlated with other data, although similar criticisms could be made of Google's online search engine.

== Google Compute ==
Google Compute was a separately downloadable add-on for the Google Toolbar which utilized the user's computer to help the Folding@home distributed computing project, which studies disease-relevant protein folding and other molecular dynamics. It was founded in March 2002 by Google co-founder Sergey Brin. Functionally, it downloaded a small packet of work, performed calculations on it, and uploaded it back to Stanford University. Although it was limited in functionality and scope, it increased Folding@home's participation from 10,000 up to about 30,000 active CPUs. The program ended in October 2005 in favor of the project's official clients, and is no longer available for the Toolbar.

== Discontinuation ==
On December 12, 2021, Google Toolbar was quietly shut down by Google. The website redirected to Toolbar Support, stating the user should install Google Chrome instead, and showed instructions on how to uninstall Toolbar for those on Internet Explorer. Computers that still have Google Toolbar are not affected. It now redirects to Chrome Support.

== See also ==
- Alexa Toolbar
- AOL Toolbar
- Bing Bar
- Yahoo! Toolbar
