= Yahoo Toolbar =

Yahoo! Toolbar
- Developer(s): Yahoo!
- Operating system: Microsoft Windows; Mac OS X Linux
- Type: Toolbar
- License: Proprietary freeware
- Website: addons.mozilla.org/en-GB/firefox/addon/yahoo-toolbar-and-new-tab/

Yahoo! Toolbar is a browser plugin. It is available for Internet Explorer, Firefox and Google Chrome browsers.

Yahoo! Toolbar has been around for more than 10 years and has evolved since its inception.

Originally aimed at being a bookmark and pop-up blocker, it evolved to provide an app-like experience within the Toolbar. It has apps for leading sites like Facebook, Yahoo! Mail, Weather and News. It also allows users to bookmark sites and manage them. It continues to support features like button shortcuts to top internet sites like Amazon, Twitter, etc. It also allows access to several functions, including Yahoo! Search

Yahoo! Chrome Toolbar is the most recent addition to the Yahoo! Toolbar family.

Opera and Safari are not supported.

It has built-in algorithms to prevent pop-ups and spyware.

Several additional features are available on the Internet Explorer version, as well as incorporating Firefox-style tabbed browsing to IE version 6.0 (versions 7.0 and later allow tabbed browsing).

The Yahoo! Toolbar has a well-known and dark history of being bundled with other software. The toolbar often installs itself without the user's knowledge or consent. Yahoo! is known for paying developers to place the toolbar into programs in such a way that inexperienced users may unwillingly install it. Installation of the toolbar can result in changes to the browser homepage, default search engine, and web-tracking preferences.

== System requirements ==
To install, computers must meet the following requirements:

=== Windows ===
- Windows 98 or higher
- Internet Explorer 6.0 or higher
- Firefox 1.5 or higher

=== Mac and Linux ===
- Firefox 1.5 or higher

== Similar toolbars ==
- Alexa Toolbar
- AOL Toolbar
- Bing Bar
- Google Toolbar
