= Mortimer Taube =

American librarian (1910–1965)

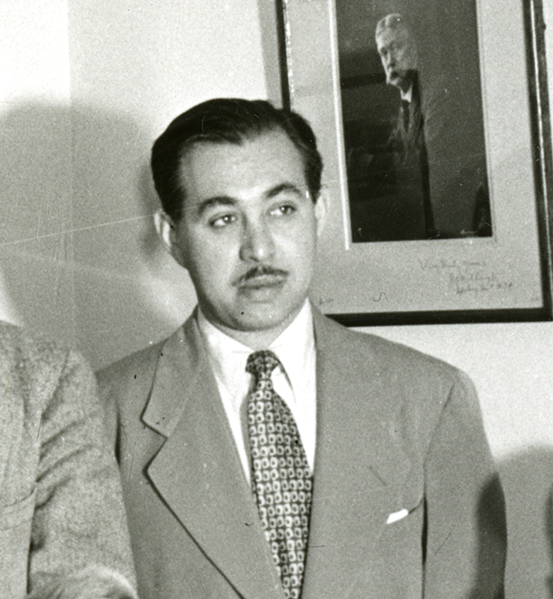
- Born: December 6, 1910
- Died: September 3, 1965 (aged 54); Annapolis
- Alma mater: University of Chicago
- Occupation: Librarian
- Employer: Duke University; Harvard University

Mortimer Taube (December 6, 1910 – September 3, 1965) was an American librarian. He is recognized as one the 100 most important leaders in American library and information science of the 20th century. He was important to the library science field because he invented Coordinate Indexing, which uses "uniterms" in the context of cataloging. It is the forerunner to computer based searches. In the early 1950s he started his own company, Documentation, Inc. with Gerald J. Sophar. Previously he worked at such institutions as the Library of Congress, the Department of Defense, and the Atomic Energy Commission. American Libraries calls him "an innovator and inventor, as well as scholar and savvy businessman." Current Biography called him the "Dewey of mid-twentieth Librarianship." Taube had a variety of other interests including tennis, philosophy, sailing, music, and collecting paintings.

== Education and early career ==
Mortimer Taube was born in Jersey City, New Jersey on December 6, 1910. He earned a Bachelor of Arts in philosophy from the University of Chicago in 1933, followed by a Ph.D. in philosophy from the University of California at Berkeley in 1935. The following year, 1936, he received a certificate in librarianship from Berkeley. For some time after this, he worked at various libraries and was a lecturer at Mills College, Harvard University, Duke University, University of Chicago, and Columbia University.

== Innovation after the war ==
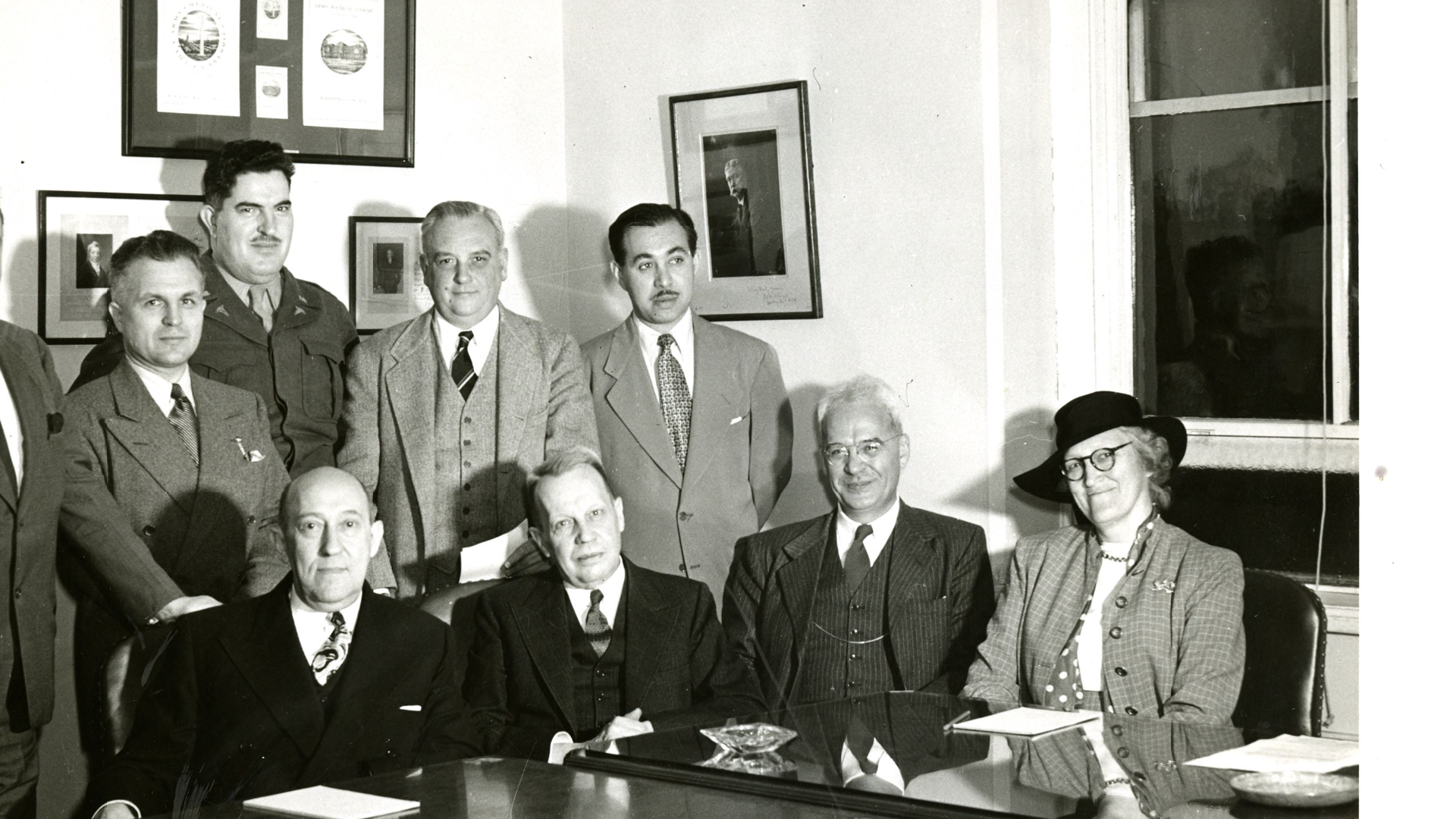
Consultants for the study of indexes to medical literature: Dr. Lewis H. Weed, chairman, Dr. John F. Fulton, Dr. Sanford V. Larkey, Dr. Chauncey D. Leake, Dr. William S. Middleton, Dr. Ebbe C. Hoff, Dr. Eugene W. Scott, Dr. Mortimer Taube, Mr. Ralph R. Shaw, Miss Janet Doe, Dr. Morris Fishbein – ex officio, Colonel J.H. McNinch, MC – ex officio.

In 1944, Mortimer Taube transitioned from academia to focus on becoming a true innovator in the field of science, especially information science. After the war, there was a huge boom of scientific invention, and the literature to go with it. The contemporary indexing and retrieval methods simply could not handle the inflow. New technology was needed to meet this high demand and Mortimer Taube delivered. He dabbled in many projects during and after the war. In 1944 he joined the Library of Congress as the Assistant Chief of the General Reference and Bibliographical Division. He was then head of the Science and Technology project from 1947 to 1949. He worked for the Atomic Energy Commission, which was established after "the Manhattan District Project wanted to evaluate and publish the scientific and engineering records showing the advancements made during the war." Their goal was also to make the material more readily available to the public and to open up business with countries abroad. He was Deputy Chief of the Technical Information Service. He also presented on the subject of Information Storage and Retrieval at a Symposium held by the Air Force Office of Scientific Research in 1958 in Washington D.C.

== Documentation, Inc. ==
Mortimer Taube also worked heavily with documentation, the literature pertaining to the new scientific innovation. He was a consultant and Lecturer on Scientific Documentation and was even the editor of American Documentation in the years 1952–1953. In 1952, Taube co-founded Documentation, Inc. with Gerald J. Sophar and two others. Documentation, Inc. was the "largest aerospace information center" and did work for NASA. Here Taube developed Coordinate Indexing, an important innovation in the field of library science. Taube defines Coordinate Indexing as, "the analysis of any field of information into a set of terms and the combination of these terms in any order to achieve any desired degree of detail in either indexing or selection." Coordinate Indexing used "uniterms" to make storing and retrieving information easier and faster. Uniterms "constitute a special set of rules and requirements which makes both the analysis into terms and the combination of the terms in order to specify items of information a remarkably simple and efficient process." Taube had split coordinate indexing into two categories, item and term indexing. It used punch cards and a machine reader to search for specific items or documents by terms or keywords. Documentation, Inc. also brought forth the IBM 9900 Special Index Analyzer, also known as COMAC. COMAC stood for "continuous multiple access controller." This machine handled data punch cards, used for information storage and retrieval. It made "logical relationships among terms." Even though Documentation Inc. started as a small company, it soon grew to well over 700 members.

== Personal life ==
Taube married Bernice, and they had three children: a son, Donald, and two daughters, Deborah and Susan.

Taube had a variety of interests, including tennis, sailing, music, and collecting paintings. He was very active, frequently sleeping for only two or three hours a night. Taube developed an interest in philosophy in his later years and was writing a book on the subject before he died. While his technology work influenced modern computer cataloguing systems and OPACs, he did not have a high regard for computers, as they "didn't think."

=== Death ===
Taube died suddenly of a heart attack at the age of 54 after sailing on his boat.

== Selected works ==
- (1936).(2017). Causation Freedom and Determinism: An Attempt to Solve the Causal Problem through a Study of Its Origins in Seventeenth-Century Philosophy. London: Routledge.
- — (June 1, 1941). "The Theory of Book Selection". College & Research Libraries. 2 (3): 221–225. doi:10.5860/crl_02_03_221. hdl:2142/31767. ISSN 2150-6701.
- (1948). “Memorandum for a Conference on Bibliographical Control of Government Scientific and Technical Reports.” Special Libraries 39 (May): 154–60.
- (1950). “Cataloging of Publications of Corporate Authors.” Library Quarterly 20 (April): 1–20.
- — (1952). "Special librarianship and documentation". American Documentation. 3 (3): 166–167. doi:10.1002/asi.5090030311. ISSN 1936-6108.
- (1952). “Possibilities for Cooperative Work in Subject Controls.” American Documentation 3 (January): 21–28.
- — (October 1, 1953). "A Bibliographic Classification, Extended by Systematic Auxiliary Schedules for Composite Specification and Notation. 2d ed. (Book Review)". College & Research Libraries. 14 (4): 453–455. doi:10.5860/crl_14_04_453. hdl:2142/36545. ISSN 2150-6701.
- (1953). Coordinate Indexing. Documentation, Incorporated, 1953.
- with Wachtel, Irma S. (1953). "The logical structure of coordinate indexing". American Documentation. 4 (2): 67–68. doi:10.1002/asi.5090040206. ISSN 1936-6108.
- (1953–1956). Studies in Coordinate Indexing. Washington, D.C.: 1953–1959.
- (1955). “Storage and Retrieval of Information by Means of the Association of Ideas.” American Documentation 6 (January): 1–18.
- (1956). Machine retrieval of information. Library Trends: 301–308.
- (1957) With Laurence B Heilprin, Documentation Incorporated and United States Air Force Office of Scientific Research, Directorate of Advanced Studies. The Relation of the Size of the Question to the Work Accomplished by a Storage and Retrieval System. Washington D.C: Documentation : Distributed by Directorate of Advanced Studies Air Force Office of Scientific Research.
- (1957), United States Air Force, Office of Scientific Research. Meaning, Linguistic Structures and Storage and Retrieval Systems. Washington D.C: Documentations.
- (1958). Taube, Mortimer, and Harold Wooster. Information Storage and Retrieval. New York: Columbia University Press, 1958.
- (1958). United States Air Force, Office of Scientific Research Directorate of Research Communication. An Evaluation of the Use Studies of Scientific Information. Washington D.C: Documentation.
- (1959). Emerging Solutions for Mechanizing the Storage and Retrieval of Information. Washington: Documentation.
- — (1961). "Documentation, Information Retrieval, and Other New Techniques". The Library Quarterly: Information, Community, Policy. 31 (1): 90–103. ISSN 0024-2519.
- (1961).Computers and Common Sense, the Myth of Thinking Machines. 1961.
- (1961). United States Air Force, Office of Scientific Research. 1961. Experiments with the IBM-9900 and a Discussion of an Improved Comac as Suggested by These Experiments April 1961. Washington D.C: Documentation.
- — (January 1964). "Coming of Age of Information Technology". Bulletin of the Medical Library Association. 52 (1): 120–127. ISSN 0025-7338. PMC 198080. PMID 14119281.
- (1964). “Theoretical Principles of Information Organization in Librarianship.” Library Quarterly 34 (July): 352–61.
- (1964). A Program for the Library Research Institute of the University of California. Bethesda Md: Documentation.

== Awards ==
- Award of Merit (1966)-Association for Information Science and Technology
- Distinguished Contributions to Special Librarianship.(1952) Special Libraries Association-1952.

== Bibliography ==
- Garvey Shunryu Colin. 2021. “The ‘General Problem Solver’ Does Not Exist: Mortimer Taube and the Art of AI Criticism.” IEEE Annals of the History of Computing: 60–73.
- Kniffel, Leonard; Sullivan, Peggy; McCormick, Edith, eds. (1999). "100 of the Most Important Leaders We had in the 20th Century". American Libraries. 30: 38.
- "Mortimer Taube Dies; Founded Data Service", The Washington Post and Times-Herald (1959–1973), September 5, 1965
- "MORTIMER TAUBE". Bulletin of the Medical Library Association. 53 (4): 686–687. 1965. PMC 198347.
- Osborn Andrew D. 1991. “From Cutter and Dewey to Mortimer Taube and Beyond a Complete Century of Change in Cataloguing and Classification.” Cataloging & Classification Quarterly 35–50.
- Smith, Elizabeth S., "On the Shoulder of Giants: from Boole to Shannon to Taube: the Origins of Computerized Information from the Mid-19th Century to the Present," Information Technology and Libraries (1993): http://www.accessmylibrary.com/article-1G1-13188135/shoulders-giants-boole-shannon.html
