= Toolbar =

Element of computer graphical interfaces

Toolbar from the text editor gedit. From left to right, the icons are for creating a new file; opening an existing file; saving a file (a floppy disk icon); printing the current file; undoing and redoing edits (grayed out since no edits have been made); cut, copy, and paste; search; search and replace.

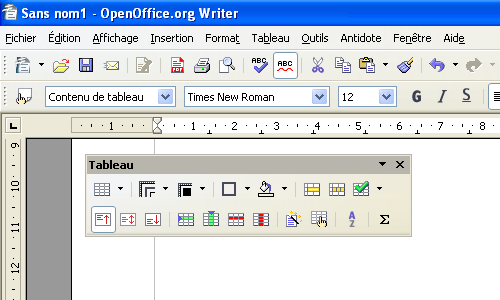
OpenOffice.org allows its toolbars to be detached and moved between windows and other toolbars.

The toolbar, also called a bar or standard toolbar (originally known as ribbon), is a graphical control element on which on-screen icons can be used. A toolbar often allows for quick access to functions that are commonly used in the program. Some examples of functions a toolbar might have are open file, save, and change font. Toolbars are usually distinguished from palettes by their integration into the edges of the screen or of other windows. This can result in wasted space if multiple underpopulated bars are stacked atop each other or interface inefficiency if overloaded bars are placed on small windows.

== Variants ==
There are several user interface elements derived from toolbars:

- An address bar, location bar or URL bar is a toolbar that mainly consists of a text box. It typically accepts URLs or file system addresses. They are found in web browsers and file managers.
- A breadcrumb or breadcrumb trail allows users to keep track of their locations within a program or a file system. They are toolbars whose contents dynamically change to indicate the navigation path.
- A ribbon was originally used to refer to a toolbar, but it now means a complex user interface which consists of multiple toolbars chosen between through tabs.
- A taskbar is a toolbar provided by an operating system to launch, monitor and manipulate software. A taskbar may hold other sub-toolbars.

A search box is not in itself a toolbar but one may appear within a toolbar, as is the case with the address bar.

Toolbars may appear in various software. Some web browsers allow the user to customize its toolbars' contents or location. Plug-ins can be used to add new toolbars to some programs.

Sometimes trojan horse viruses will take the form of a toolbar.

== See also ==
- Browser toolbar
