= Harold Cleverdon =

Canadian Anglican priest in the 20th century

Harold Dawe Cleverdon (1904 in Yatton – 1994 in Toronto) was a Canadian Anglican priest in the 20th century.

Harold was educated at the University of Toronto. Ordained in 1935, his first post was a curacy at The Church of the Messiah, Toronto. He held incumbencies at Mulmur, Lakeview and Oshawa. He was Archdeacon of Scarborough from 1956 to 1969.
