= Data Toolbar =

Computer software

- Developer(s): DataTool Services
- Operating system: Microsoft Windows
- Type: Browser toolbar, Web scraping
- Website: www.datatoolbar.com

Data Toolbar is a Web scraping computer software add-on to the Internet Explorer, Mozilla Firefox, and Google Chrome Web browsers that collects and converts the structured data from Web pages into a tabular format that can be loaded into a spreadsheet or database management program.

== Algorithm ==
The program implements a variation of the genetic tree-matching algorithm with respect to nested lists. That is, inside a given website, the program recursively traverses the branches of its DOM tree, aiming to detect nested lists of data items matching the format of the specified content. This approach is known to have several advantages over a simple string-matching algorithm.

== Features ==
- Collection of data and images directly from the Internet Explorer.
- Collection of information from Details pages linked to the catalog.
- Automatic processing of multi-page catalogs.
- Support of irregular multi-row catalogs mixed with advertisement.

== See also ==
- Automation Anywhere - The Web Extractor is a part of the larger automation system
