= Tie-Yan Liu =

Chinese computer scientist

Tie-Yan Liu (Chinese: 刘铁岩; born 1976) is a Chinese computer scientist.

After completing his degree from the department of electronic engineering at Tsinghua University, Liu began working at the Microsoft in 2003, and was appointed the assistant managing director of Microsoft Research Asia in 2015. Liu joined Microsoft Research AI4Science as a distinguished Scientist in 2022. Liu was elected an IEEE fellow in 2017 and elected an ACM Fellow in 2021. He is currently the President of Zhongguancun Academy and Chairman of Zhongguancun Institute of Artificial Intelligence in Beijing.
