= Faceted search =

Method of information retrieval

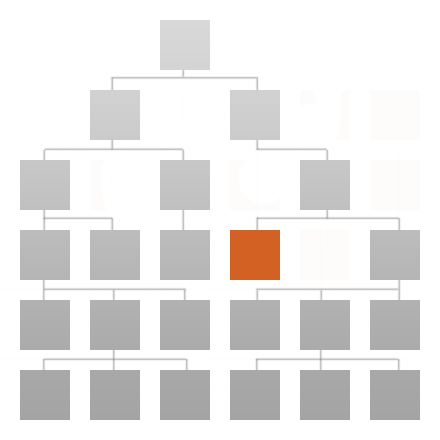
Navigation search for an element

Faceted search augments lexical search with a faceted navigation system, allowing users to narrow results by applying filters based on a faceted classification of the items. It is a parametric search technique. A faceted classification system classifies each information element along multiple explicit dimensions, facets, enabling the classifications to be accessed and ordered in multiple ways rather than in a single, predetermined, taxonomic order.

Facets correspond to properties of the information elements. They are often derived by analysis of the text of an item using entity extraction techniques or from pre-existing fields in a database such as author, descriptor, language, and format. Thus, existing web-pages, product descriptions or online collections of articles can be augmented with navigational facets.

Faceted search interfaces were first developed in the academic world by Ben Shneiderman, Steven Pollitt, Marti Hearst, and Gary Marchionini in the 1990s and 2000s. The most well-known of these efforts was the Flamenco research project at University of California, Berkeley, which was led by Marti Hearst. Concurrently, there was development of commercial faceted search systems, notably Endeca and Spotfire.

Within the academic community, faceted search has attracted interest primarily among library and information science researchers, and to some extent among computer science researchers specializing in information retrieval.

== Mass market use ==
Faceted search has become a popular technique in commercial search applications, particularly for online retailers and libraries. An increasing number of enterprise search vendors provide software for implementing faceted search applications.

Online retail catalogs pioneered the earliest applications of faceted search, reflecting both the faceted nature of product data (most products have a type, brand, price, etc.) and the ready availability of the data in retailers' existing information-systems. In the early 2000s, retailers started using faceted search, in part due to published studies that evaluated user search experience on popular sites. Faceted search improves navigation and conversion by helping users find relevant products more quickly.

As of 2014, 40% of the 50 largest US-based online retailers had implemented faceted search. Examples include the filtering options that appear in the left column on amazon.com or Google Shopping after a keyword search has been performed.

== Libraries and information science ==
In 1933, the noted librarian Ranganathan proposed a faceted classification system for library materials, known as colon classification. In the pre-computer era, he did not succeed in replacing the pre-coordinated Dewey Decimal Classification system.

Modern online library catalogs, also known as online public access catalogs (OPAC), have increasingly adopted faceted search interfaces. Noted examples include the North Carolina State University library catalog (part of the Triangle Research Libraries Network) and the OCLC Open WorldCat system. The CiteSeerX project at the Pennsylvania State University allows faceted search for academic documents and continues to expand into other facets such as table search.

== See also ==
- Enterprise search
- Exploratory search
- Faceted classification
- Human–computer information retrieval
- Information extraction
- NoSQL
- Controlled vocabulary
- Thesaurus (information retrieval)
