= Karen Spärck Jones Award =

Annual award in computer information retrieval

To commemorate the achievements of Karen Spärck Jones, the Karen Spärck Jones Award was created in 2008 by the British Computer Society (BCS) and its Information Retrieval Specialist Group (BCS IRSG). Since 2024, the award has been sponsored by Bloomberg. Prior to 2024, it was sponsored by Microsoft Research.

The winner of the award is invited to present a keynote talk the following year alternately at the European Conference on Information Retrieval (ECIR) or the Conference of the European Chapter of the Association for Computational Linguistics (EACL).

== Awardees ==
Year	Recipient	Keynote talk
2009	Mirella Lapata	Image and Natural Language Processing for Multimedia Information Retrieval
2010	Evgeniy Gabrilovich	Ad Retrieval Systems in vitro and in vivo: Knowledge-Based Approaches to Computational Advertising
2011	—	No award was made
2012	Diane Kelly	Contours and Convergence
2013	Eugene Agichtein	Inferring Searcher Attention and Intention by Mining Behavior Data
2014	Ryen W. White	Mining and Modeling Online Health Search
2015	Jordan Boyd-Graber; Emine Yilmaz	Opening up the Black Box: Interactive Machine Learning for Understanding Large Document Collections, Characterizing Social Science, and Language-Based Games; A Task-Based Perspective to Information Retrieval
2016	Jaime Teevan	Search, Re-Search.
2017	Fernando Diaz (computer scientist)	The Harsh Reality of Production Information Access Systems
2018	Krisztian Balog	On Entities and Evaluation
2019	Chirag Shah	Task-Based Intelligent Retrieval and Recommendation
2020	Ahmed H. Awadallah	Learning with Limited Labeled Data: The Role of User Interactions
2021	Ivan Vulić	Towards Language Technology for a Truly Multilingual World?
2022	William Yang Wang	Large Language Models for Question Answering: Challenges and Opportunities
2023	Hongning Wang	Human vs. Generative AI in Content Creation Competition: Symbiosis or Conflict?
2024	Isabelle Augenstein	Understanding the Interplay between LLMs’ Utilisation of Parametric and Contextual Knowledge
2025	Andrew Yates	Search with Complex Topics and Learned Sparse Retrieval
