= Anchor text =

Visible, clickable text in a hyperlink

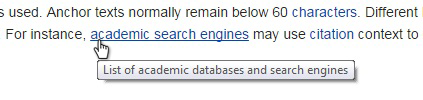
The phrase "academic search engines" is the anchor text in the hyperlink that the cursor is pointing to.

The anchor text, link label, or link text is the visible, clickable text in an HTML hyperlink. The term "anchor" was used in older versions of the HTML specification for what is currently referred to as the "a element", or <a>. The HTML specification does not have a specific term for anchor text, but refers to it as "text that the a element wraps around". In XML terms, the anchor text is the content of the element, provided that the content is text.

Usually, web search engines analyze anchor text from hyperlinks on web pages. The words contained in the anchor text can determine the ranking that the page will receive from search engines. Other services apply the basic principles of anchor text analysis as well. For instance, academic search engines may use citation context to classify academic articles, and anchor text from documents linked in mind maps may be used too.

== Overview ==
Anchor text usually gives the user relevant descriptive or contextual information about the content of the link's destination. The anchor text may or may not be related to the actual text of the URL of the link. For example, a hyperlink to the English-language Wikipedia's homepage might take this form:

<a href="http://en.wikipedia.org/wiki/Main_Page">Wikipedia</a>

"Wikipedia" is the anchor text in this example. The URL it points to is http://en.wikipedia.org/wiki/Main_Page. The entire hyperlink appears on a web page as Wikipedia.

== Search engine algorithms ==
Anchor text is weighted (ranked) highly in search engine algorithms, because the linked text is usually relevant to the landing page. The objective of search engines is to provide highly relevant search results; this is where anchor text helps, as the tendency is, more often than not, to hyperlink a few carefully selected words that are relevant to the landing page. Anchor text can also serve the purpose of directing the user to internal pages on the site, which can also help to rank the website higher in the search rankings. In his brief history of Web Search, Steve Robertson reflected on the importance of anchor text in web search, stating that "Matching anchor text well is vital for a good web search engine...".

Webmasters may use anchor text to procure high results in search engine results pages. Google's Webmaster Tools facilitates this optimization by letting website owners view the most common words in anchor text linking to their site.

In the past, Google bombing was possible through anchor text manipulation; however, in January 2007, Google announced it had updated its algorithm to minimize the impact of Google bombs, which refers to a prank where people attempt to cause someone else's site to rank for an obscure or meaningless query.

In April 2012, Google announced in its March "Penguin" update that it would be changing the way it handled anchor text, implying that anchor text would no longer be as important an element for its ranking metrics. Moving forward, Google would be paying more attention to a diversified link profile, which has a mix of anchor text and other types of links.

However, a 2016 study of anchor text influence across 16,000 keywords found that the presence of exact and partial match anchor links continues to have a strong correlation with Google rankings. An August 2016 study conducted by Moz found that exact- and partial-match domains can be affected by an over-optimization penalty, since Google considers branded and naked URL links on such domains to be exact-match anchors.

=== Terminology ===
There are different classifications of anchor text that are used within the search engine optimization community, such as the following:

Exact match
An anchor that is used with a keyword that mirrors the page that is being linked to. Example: "search engine optimization" is an exact match anchor because it's linking to a page about "search engine optimization".
Partial match
An anchor that is used with a keyword and a variation that mirrors the page that is being linked to. Example: "different search engine optimization techniques" is a partial match anchor text as it links to a broader concept (i.e., to the article about search engine optimization).
Branded
A brand that is used as the anchor. "Wikipedia" is a branded anchor text.
Naked link
A URL that is used as an anchor. "www.wikipedia.com" is a naked link anchor.
Generic
A generic word or phrase that is used as the anchor. "Click here" is a generic anchor recommended against on grounds of usability and accessibility. Other variations may include "go here", "visit this website", etc.
Images
Whenever an image is linked, Google will use the "alt" attribute as the anchor text.
Empty
Whenever an image is linked, and the "alt" attribute is empty.
Latent semantic indexing
Latent semantic indexing (LSI) is a method used by Google to determine similar keywords.

== See also ==
- Hypertext
- Hyperlink
