= Medical students' disease =

Condition in medical students

Medical students' disease (also known as second year syndrome or intern's syndrome) is a condition frequently reported in medical students, who perceive themselves to be experiencing the symptoms of a disease that they are studying.

The condition is associated with the fear of contracting the disease in question. Some authors suggested that the condition must be referred to as nosophobia rather than "hypochondriasis", because the quoted studies show a very low percentage of hypochondriacal character of the condition, and hence the term "hypochondriasis" would have ominous therapeutic and prognostic indications. The reference suggests that the condition is associated with immediate preoccupation with the symptoms in question, leading the student to become unduly aware of various casual psychological and physiological dysfunctions; cases show little correlation with the severity of psychopathology, but rather with accidental factors related to learning and experience.

== Overview ==
Baars (2001) writes that medical students who study "frightening diseases" for the first time routinely experience vivid delusions of having contracted such diseases, and describes it as a "temporary kind of hypochondria". Baars says that the experience is so common that it has become known as "medical student syndrome".

Hodges (2004), reviewing the literature, said that "the first descriptions of medical students' disease appeared in the 1960s." He may have been referring to the phrase, for the phenomenon itself was noted much earlier. George Lincoln Walton (1908) reported that

Medical instructors are continually consulted by students who fear that they have the diseases they are studying. The knowledge that pneumonia produces pain in a certain spot leads to a concentration of attention upon that region which causes any sensation there to give alarm. The mere knowledge of the location of the appendix transforms the most harmless sensations in that region into symptoms of serious menace.

Hodges also said that it was suggested in the 1960s that:

This phenomenon caused a significant amount of stress for students and was present in approximately 70 to 80 percent of students... papers written in the 1980s and 1990s conceptualised the condition as an illness in the psychiatric spectrum of hypochondriasis.... Marcus found that the dream content of year two medical students frequently involved a preoccupation with personal illness. Marcus's subjects reported many dreams in which they had illnesses of the heart, the eyes and the bowels, among others.

Hodges went on to describe work by Moss-Morris and Pétrie who saw medical students' disease as "a normal perceptual process, rather than a form of hypochondriasis." Learning about a disease "creates a mental schema or representation of the illness which includes the label of the illness and the symptoms associated with the condition. Once this representation is formed, symptoms or bodily sensations that the individual is currently experiencing which are consistent with the schema may be noticed, while inconsistent symptoms are ignored."

Howes and Salkovskis (1998) noted that "medical students frequently develop fears and symptoms of illness. This has been termed medical students' disease, nosophobia, hypochondriasis of medical students, and medicalstudentitis." They mentioned two studies, one concluding that about 70% of medical students have groundless medical fears during their studies, and one which found that 78.8% of a randomly chosen sample of medical students showed a history of "medical student disease." However, they cite a number of studies showing a similar incidence of hypochondria in law students and other non-medical students, which they said call into question "the widely held view that medical students are more likely than others to have excessive anxiety about their health."

== In popular culture ==
An episode of the TV show Scrubs called "Our Driving Issues" features a class of medical students who, despite having been warned about medical students' disease, nevertheless have it.

In the Indian film Dharma Durai, one of the lead characters, Dr. Stella, has second-year syndrome.

In episode eight of the Canadian TV show Total Drama, season two, Total Drama Action, called "One Flu Over the Cuckoos" features a challenge for the contestants where they are forced to read medical textbooks all night - combined with the lack of sleep many contestants had Medical Students' Disease, and in the end Leshawna is the one who calms the rest of the contestants down after figuring out that the diseases they all thought they had were fake, securing the win for her and her team.

In the 1889 comic novel Three Men in a Boat by Jerome K. Jerome, the narrator reads a medical textbook and comes to believe he is suffering from every condition listed in the book, with the exception of housemaid's knee.

In Umberto Eco's 1980 novel, The Name of the Rose, Adso, the narrator comments: "I learned later that, reading books of medicine, you are always convinced you feel the pains of which they speak".

In the 2005 young-adult novel Code Orange by Caroline B. Cooney, Mitty, a student researching smallpox for a report, finds smallpox scabs in an old book and wonders if they can still transmit the virus. He believes he is infected with smallpox after he begins feeling sick.

In the 1999 Canadian cartoon Ed, Edd, n Eddy, in season 4 episode 9, “A Case of Ed,” Double D is intrigued by books he had received from a local library’s sale. One of these books titled “The Encyclopedia of Obscure Diseases” had him particularly interested. As he read of an obscure and fictional disease known as the “Lackadaisy-Cathro Disease,” he realized its main symptoms were behaviors that he happened to have as personality traits. Once believing that Double D himself has contracted this disease only after just learning about it, friends Ed and Eddy feed into Double D’s incorrect self-diagnosis for their own amusement to the point that Double D believes he will expire soon. He is immediately cured of his “afflictions” once the other children of the cul-de-sac help him realize that he had fooled himself into being sick.

In an episode of Frasier, a caller describes himself as having multiple mental health disorders, then reveals he is a psychiatry student when asked by Dr. Crane. Dr. Crane explains the Medical Student's Disease phenomenon and assures the caller he has nothing to worry about, but advises him to wait until after spring break to read about sexual disorders.

== See also ==
- Apophenia
- Cyberchondria
- Self diagnosis
