= ACM Transactions on the Web =

- Discipline: Computer science
- Language: English
- Edited by: Ryen W. White

Publication details
- History: 2007–present
- Publisher: Association for Computing Machinery
- Frequency: Quarterly
- Impact factor: 4.1 (2024)

Standard abbreviations
- ISO 4: ACM Trans. Web

Indexing
- ISSN: 1559-1131 (print); 1559-114X (web)
- LCCN: 2005215922
- OCLC no.: 62384845

Links
- Journal homepage; Online archive

ACM Transactions on the Web is a quarterly peer-reviewed scientific journal reporting the results of research on Web content, applications, use, and related enabling technologies. It was established in 2007 and is published by the Association for Computing Machinery. The editor-in-chief is Ryen W. White (Microsoft Research).

The journal is abstracted and indexed in the Science Citation Index Expanded and Current Contents/Engineering, Computing & Technology. According to the Journal Citation Reports, the journal has a 2024 impact factor of 4.1.
