= Tf–idf =

Estimate of the importance of a word in a document

In information retrieval, tf–idf (term frequency–inverse document frequency, TF*IDF, TFIDF, TF–IDF, or Tf–idf) is a measure of importance of a word to a document in a collection or corpus, adjusted for the fact that some words appear more frequently in general. Like the bag-of-words model, it models a document as a multiset of words, without word order. It is a refinement over the simple bag-of-words model, by allowing the weight of words to depend on the rest of the corpus.

It was often used as a weighting factor in searches of information retrieval, text mining, and user modeling. A survey conducted in 2015 showed that 83% of text-based recommender systems in digital libraries used tf–idf. Variations of the tf–idf weighting scheme were often used by search engines as a central tool in scoring and ranking a document's relevance given a user query.

One of the simplest ranking functions is computed by summing the tf–idf for each query term; many more sophisticated ranking functions are variants of this simple model.

== Motivations ==
Karen Spärck Jones (1972) conceived a statistical interpretation of term-specificity called Inverse Document Frequency (idf), which became a cornerstone of term weighting:

The specificity of a term can be quantified as an inverse function of the number of documents in which it occurs.

For example, the df (document frequency) and idf for some words in Shakespeare's 37 plays might be represented as follows:

Word	df	idf
Romeo	1	1.57
salad	2	1.27
Falstaff	4	0.966
forest	12	0.489
battle	21	0.246
wit	34	0.037
fool	36	0.012
good	37	0
sweet	37	0

In the example above, "Romeo", "Falstaff", and "salad" appears in very few plays; since only a handful of plays contain them, their appearance would significantly narrow down the possible list of plays. In contrast, "good" and "sweet" appear in every play and are completely uninformative as to which play it is.

== Definition ==
1. The tf–idf is the product of two statistics, term frequency and inverse document frequency. There are various ways for determining the exact values of both statistics.
2. A formula that aims to define the importance of a keyword or phrase within a document or a web page.

Variants of term frequency (tf) weight
weighting scheme	tf weight
binary	${0,1}$
raw count	$f_{t,d}$
term frequency	$f_{t,d} \Bigg/ {\sum_{t' \in d}{f_{t',d}}}$
log normalization	$\log (1 + f_{t,d})$
double normalization 0.5	$0.5 + 0.5 \cdot \frac { f_{t,d} }{\max_{\{t' \in d\}} {f_{t',d}}}$
double normalization K	$K + (1 - K) \frac { f_{t,d} }{\max_{\{t' \in d\}} {f_{t',d}}}$

=== Term frequency ===
Term frequency, tf(t,d), is the relative frequency of term t within document d,

$$\mathrm{tf}(t,d) = \frac{f_{t,d}}{{\sum_{t' \in d}{f_{t',d}}}}$$,

where f_{t,d} is the raw count of a term in a document, i.e., the number of times that term t occurs in document d. Note the denominator is simply the total number of terms in document d (counting each occurrence of the same term separately). There are various other ways to define term frequency:

- the raw count itself: tf(t,d) = f_{t,d}
- Boolean "frequencies": tf(t,d) = 1 if t occurs in d and 0 otherwise;
- logarithmically scaled frequency: tf(t,d) = log (1 + f_{t,d});
- augmented frequency, to prevent a bias towards longer documents, e.g. raw frequency divided by the raw frequency of the most frequently occurring term in the document:

$$\mathrm{tf}(t,d) = 0.5 + 0.5 \cdot  \frac{f_{t, d}}{\max\{f_{t', d}:t' \in d\}}$$

=== Inverse document frequency ===
Variants of inverse document frequency (idf) weight
weighting scheme	idf weight ($n_t = |\{d \in D: t \in d\}|$)
unary	1
inverse document frequency	$\log \frac {N} {n_t} = - \log \frac {n_t} {N}$
inverse document frequency smooth	$\log \left( \frac {N} {1 + n_t}\right)+ 1$
inverse document frequency max	$\log \left(\frac {\max_{\{t' \in d\}} n_{t'}} {1 + n_t}\right)$
probabilistic inverse document frequency	$\log \frac {N - n_t} {n_t}$

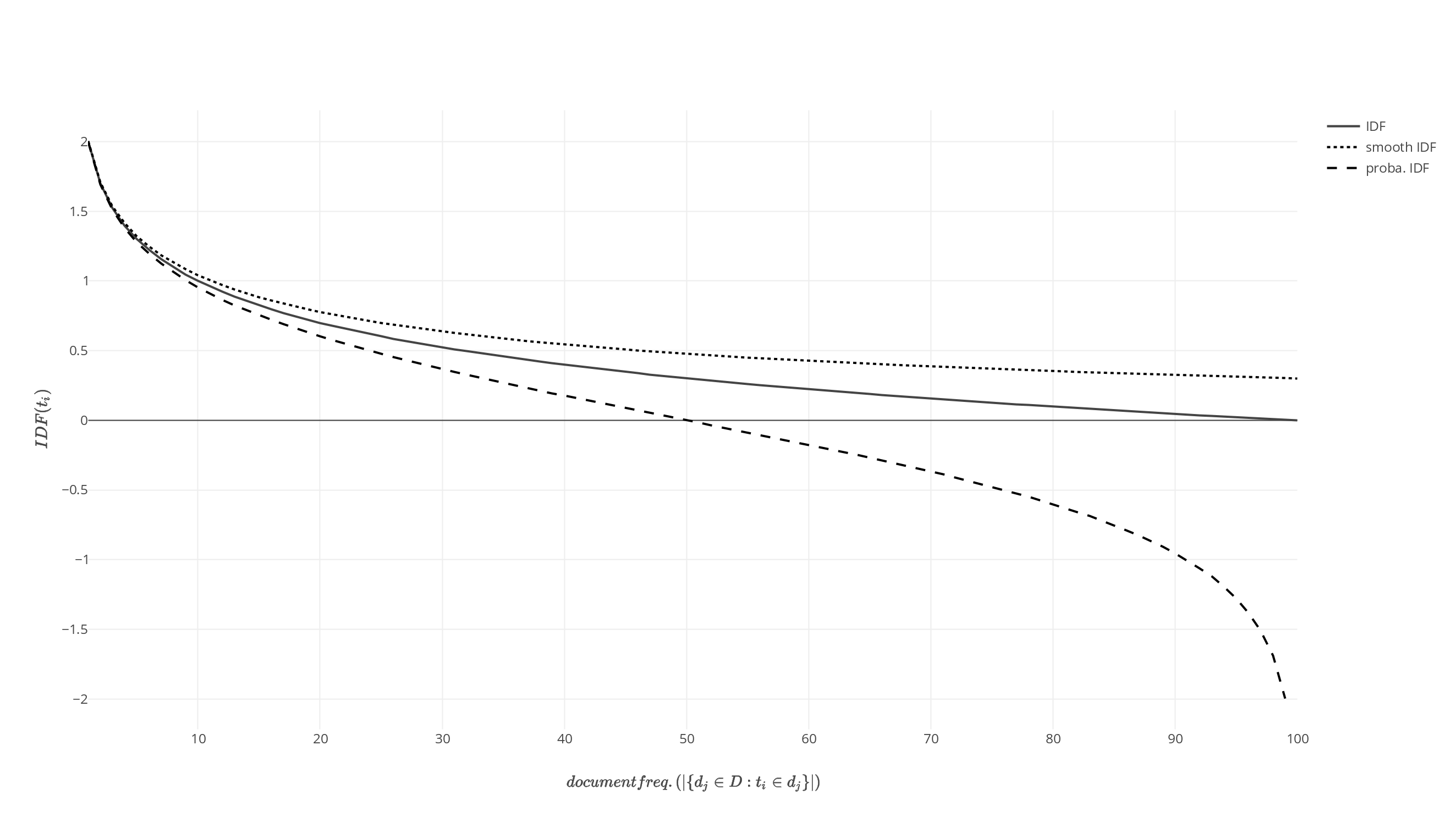
Plot of different inverse document frequency functions: standard, smooth, probabilistic.

The inverse document frequency is a measure of how much information the word provides, i.e., how common or rare it is across all documents. It is the logarithmically scaled inverse fraction of the documents that contain the word (obtained by dividing the total number of documents by the number of documents containing the term, and then taking the logarithm of that quotient):

$$\mathrm{idf}(t, D) =  \log \frac{N}{n_t}$$

with

- $D$: is the set of all documents in the corpus
- $N = {|D|}$: total number of documents in the corpus
- $n_t = |\{d \in D: t \in d\}|$ : number of documents where the term $t$ appears (i.e., $\mathrm{tf}(t,d) \neq 0$). If the term is not in the corpus, this will lead to a division-by-zero. It is therefore common to adjust the numerator to $1 + N$ and the denominator to $1 + n_t$.

=== Term frequency–inverse document frequency ===
Variants of term frequency-inverse document frequency (tf–idf) weights
weighting scheme	tf-idf
count-idf	$f_{t,d} \cdot \log \frac {N} {n_t}$
double normalization-idf	$\left(0.5 + 0.5 \frac {f_{t,q}} {\max_t f_{t,q}}\right) \cdot \log \frac {N} {n_t}$
log normalization-idf	$(1 + \log f_{t,d}) \cdot \log \frac {N} {n_t}$

Then tf–idf is calculated as

$$\mathrm{tfidf}(t,d,D) = \mathrm{tf}(t,d) \cdot \mathrm{idf}(t, D)$$

A high weight in tf–idf is reached by a high term frequency (in the given document) and a low document frequency of the term in the whole collection of documents; the weights hence tend to filter out common terms. Since the ratio inside the idf's log function is always greater than or equal to 1, the value of idf (and tf–idf) is greater than or equal to 0. As a term appears in more documents, the ratio inside the logarithm approaches 1, bringing the idf and tf–idf closer to 0.

== Justification of idf ==
Idf was introduced as "term specificity" by Karen Spärck Jones in a 1972 paper. Although it has worked well as a heuristic, its theoretical foundations have been troublesome for at least three decades afterward, with many researchers trying to find information theoretic justifications for it.

Spärck Jones's own explanation did not propose much theory, aside from a connection to Zipf's law. Attempts have been made to put idf on a probabilistic footing, by estimating the probability that a given document d contains a term t as the relative document frequency,

$$P(t|D) = \frac{|\{d \in D: t \in d\}|}{N},$$

so that we can define idf as

$$\begin{align}
\mathrm{idf} & = -\log P(t|D) \\
& = \log \frac{1}{P(t|D)} \\
& = \log \frac{N}{|\{d \in D: t \in d\}|}
\end{align}$$

Namely, the inverse document frequency is the logarithm of "inverse" relative document frequency.

This probabilistic interpretation in turn takes the same form as that of self-information. However, applying such information-theoretic notions to problems in information retrieval leads to problems when trying to define the appropriate event spaces for the required probability distributions: not only documents need to be taken into account, but also queries and terms.

== Link with information theory ==
Both term frequency and inverse document frequency can be formulated in terms of information theory; it helps to understand why their product has a meaning in terms of joint informational content of a document. A characteristic assumption about the distribution $p(d,t)$ is that:

$$p(d|t) = \frac{1}{|\{d \in D: t \in d\}|}$$

This assumption and its implications, according to Aizawa: "represent the heuristic that tf–idf employs."

The conditional entropy of a "randomly chosen" document in the corpus $D$, conditional to the fact it contains a specific term $t$ (and assuming that all documents have equal probability to be chosen) is:

$$H({\cal D}|{\cal T}=t)=-\sum_d p_{d|t}\log p_{d|t}=-\log \frac{1}{|\{d \in D: t \in d\}|}=\log \frac{|\{d \in D: t \in d\}|}{|D|} + \log |D|=-\mathrm{idf}(t)+\log |D|$$

In terms of notation, ${\cal D}$ and ${\cal T}$ are "random variables" corresponding to respectively draw a document or a term. The mutual information can be expressed as

$$M({\cal T};{\cal D}) = H({\cal D}) - H({\cal D}|{\cal T}) = \sum_t p_t\cdot(H({\cal D}) - H({\cal D}|W=t))=\sum_t p_t \cdot \mathrm{idf}(t)$$

The last step is to expand $p_t$, the unconditional probability to draw a term, with respect to the (random) choice of a document, to obtain:

$$M({\cal T};{\cal D})=\sum_{t,d} p_{t|d}\cdot p_d \cdot \mathrm{idf}(t) =  \sum_{t,d} \mathrm{tf}(t,d)\cdot \frac{1}{|D|}\cdot \mathrm{idf}(t) = \frac{1}{|D|} \sum_{t,d} \mathrm{tf}(t,d)\cdot \mathrm{idf}(t).$$

This expression shows that summing the Tf–idf of all possible terms and documents recovers the mutual information between documents and term taking into account all the specificities of their joint distribution. Each Tf–idf hence carries the "bit of information" attached to a term x document pair.

== Link with statistical theory ==
Tf–idf is closely related to the negative logarithmically transformed p-value from a one-tailed formulation of Fisher's exact test when the underlying corpus documents satisfy certain idealized assumptions. More recently, tf–idf variants were shown to arise as components in the test statistic of a penalized likelihood-ratio test for word burstiness based on a beta-binomial statistical language model. In this framework, the null hypothesis models term occurrences using a binomial distribution, while the alternative hypothesis models word burstiness using a beta-binomial distribution with a gamma-distributed penalty term placed on the beta-binomial precision parameter. The resulting test statistic contains the tf–idf variants binary term frequency–inverse document frequency (btf–idf) and term frequency–inverse collection frequency (tf–icf), thereby establishing a direct connection between tf–idf family term-weighting schemes and statistical hypothesis testing.

== Example of tf–idf ==
Suppose that we have term count tables of a corpus consisting of only two documents:

"This is a sample A."
"This is another example, another example, example."

Document 1 ($d_1$)
Term	Term Count
this	1
is	1
a	2
sample	1

Document 2 ($d_2$)
Term	Term Count
this	1
is	1
another	2
example	3

The calculation of tf–idf for the term "this" is performed as follows:

In its raw frequency form, tf is just the frequency of the "this" for each document. In each document, the word "this" appears once; but as the document 2 has more words, its relative frequency is smaller.

$$\mathrm{tf}(\mathsf{''this''}, d_{1}) = \frac{1}{5} = 0.2$$
$$\mathrm{tf}(\mathsf{''this''}, d_{2}) = \frac{1}{7} \approx 0.14$$

An idf is constant per corpus, and accounts for the ratio of documents that include the word "this". In this case, we have a corpus of two documents and all of them include the word "this".

$$\mathrm{idf}(\mathsf{''this''}, D) =  \log \left (\frac{2}{2}  \right ) = 0$$

So tf–idf is zero for the word "this", which implies that the word is not very informative as it appears in all documents.

$$\mathrm{tfidf}(\mathsf{''this''}, d_{1}, D) = 0.2 \times 0 = 0$$
$$\mathrm{tfidf}(\mathsf{''this''}, d_{2}, D) = 0.14 \times 0 = 0$$

The word "example" is more interesting - it occurs three times, but only in the second document:

$$\mathrm{tf}(\mathsf{''example''}, d_{1}) = \frac{0}{5} = 0$$
$$\mathrm{tf}(\mathsf{''example''}, d_{2}) = \frac{3}{7} \approx 0.429$$
$$\mathrm{idf}(\mathsf{''example''}, D) =  \log \left (\frac{2}{1}  \right ) = 0.301$$

Finally,

$$\mathrm{tfidf}(\mathsf{''example''}, d_1, D) = \mathrm{tf}(\mathsf{''example''}, d_1) \times \mathrm{idf}(\mathsf{''example''}, D) = 0 \times 0.301 = 0$$
$$\mathrm{tfidf}(\mathsf{''example''}, d_2, D) = \mathrm{tf}(\mathsf{''example''}, d_2) \times \mathrm{idf}(\mathsf{''example''}, D) = 0.429 \times 0.301 \approx 0.129$$

(using the base 10 logarithm).

== Beyond terms ==
The idea behind tf–idf also applies to entities other than terms. In 1998, the concept of idf was applied to citations. The authors argued that "if a very uncommon citation is shared by two documents, this should be weighted more highly than a citation made by a large number of documents". In addition, tf–idf was applied to "visual words" with the purpose of conducting object matching in videos, and entire sentences. However, the concept of tf–idf did not prove to be more effective in all cases than a plain tf scheme (without idf). When tf–idf was applied to citations, researchers could find no improvement over a simple citation-count weight that had no idf component.

== Derivatives ==
A number of term-weighting schemes have derived from tf–idf. One of them is TF–PDF (term frequency * proportional document frequency). TF–PDF was introduced in 2001 in the context of identifying emerging topics in the media. The PDF component measures the difference of how often a term occurs in different domains. Another derivate is TF–IDuF. In TF–IDuF, idf is not calculated based on the document corpus that is to be searched or recommended. Instead, idf is calculated on users' personal document collections. The authors report that TF–IDuF was equally effective as tf–idf but could also be applied in situations when, e.g., a user modeling system has no access to a global document corpus. The DELTA TF-IDF derivative uses the difference in importance of a term across two specific classes, like positive and negative sentiment. For example, it can assign a high score to a word like "excellent" in positive reviews and a low score to the same word in negative reviews. This helps identify words that strongly indicate the sentiment of a document, potentially leading to improved accuracy in text classification tasks.

== See also ==
- Word embedding
- Kullback–Leibler divergence
- Latent Dirichlet allocation
- Latent semantic analysis
- Mutual information
- Noun phrase
- Okapi BM25
- PageRank
- Vector space model
- Word count
- SMART Information Retrieval System

== External links and suggested reading ==
- Gensim is a Python library for vector space modeling and includes tf–idf weighting.
- Anatomy of a search engine
- tf–idf and related definitions as used in Lucene
- TfidfTransformer in scikit-learn
- Text to Matrix Generator (TMG) MATLAB toolbox that can be used for various tasks in text mining (TM) specifically i) indexing, ii) retrieval, iii) dimensionality reduction, iv) clustering, v) classification. The indexing step offers the user the ability to apply local and global weighting methods, including tf–idf.
- Term-frequency explained Explanation of term-frequency
