= Cyberchondria =

Unfounded concerns about common medical symptoms based on Internet materials

Cyberchondria, otherwise known as compucondria, is the unfounded escalation of concerns about common symptomology based on review of search results and literature online. Articles in popular media position cyberchondria anywhere from temporary neurotic excess to adjunct hypochondria. Cyberchondria is a growing concern among many healthcare practitioners as patients can now research any and all symptoms of a rare disease, illness or condition, and manifest a state of medical anxiety.

== Derivation and use ==
The term "cyberchondria" is a portmanteau neologism derived from the terms cyber- and hypochondria. (The term "hypochondrium" derives from Greek and literally means the region below the "cartilage" or "breast bone.") Researchers at Harris Interactive clarified the etymology of cyberchondria, and state in studies and interviews that the term is not necessarily intended to be pejorative.

A review in the British Medical Journal publication Journal of Neurology, Neurosurgery, and Psychiatry from 2003 says cyberchondria was used in 2001 in an article in the United Kingdom newspaper The Independent to describe "the excessive use of internet health sites to fuel health anxiety." The BBC also used cyberchondria in April, 2001. The BMJ review also cites the 1997 book from Elaine Showalter, who writes the internet is a new way to spread "pathogenic ideas" like Gulf War syndrome and myalgic encephalomyelitis (both of which are now recognized as physical illnesses). Patients with cyberchondria and patients of general hypochondriasis often are convinced they have disorders "with common or ambiguous symptoms."

== Studies ==
=== Online search behaviors and their influences ===
The first systematic study of cyberchondria, reported in November 2008, was performed by Microsoft researchers Ryen White and Eric Horvitz, who conducted a large-scale study that included several phases of analysis. White and Horvitz defined cyberchondria as the “unfounded escalation of concerns about common symptomatology, based on the review of search results and literature on the Web.” They analyzed a representative crawl of the web for co-occurrences of symptoms with diseases in web content as well as the content returned as search results from queries on symptoms and found high rates of linkage of rare, concerning diseases (e.g., brain tumor) to common symptoms (e.g., headache). They also analyzed anonymized large-scale logs of queries to all of the popular search engines and noted the commonality of escalations of queries from common complaints to queries on concerning diseases. They also found that potentially disruptive querying about disorders (arrived at via a search escalation) could continue in other sessions over days, weeks, and months, and that the queries could disrupt non-medical search activities.

White and Horvitz conducted a survey of over 500 people that confirmed the prevalence of web-induced medical anxieties. The survey noted that a significant portion of subjects considered the ranking of a list of results on a medical query as linked to the likelihood of relevant disorders. They point out the potential importance of findings drawn from the psychology of judgment in their work. In particular, they point out that previously studied "biases of judgment" play a role in cyberchondria. The authors highlighted the potential biases of availability (the recency and density of exposure of someone to events raises the assessed likelihood of the events) and base-rate neglect (people often do not properly consider the low prior probability of events occurring) as influencing both search engines and then people searching the web. Confirmation bias, a tendency for people to confirm their preconceptions or hypotheses, may also contribute to cyberchondria.

In a paper published in the proceedings of the 2009 Symposium of the American Medical Informatics Association, White and Horvitz present further findings from their 500-person survey on peoples’ experiences with the online investigation of medical concerns and self diagnosis. They found that overall, people report to having a low level of health anxiety, but that Web-based escalation of concerns occurs frequently for around one in five people. Two in five people report that interactions with the Web increases medical anxiety and approximately half of people report that it reduces anxiety. White and Horvitz suggest that Web content providers be cognizant of their potential to heighten medical anxiety and consider the ramifications of publishing alarming medical information, emphasize the importance of Web content in facilitating patient-physician interaction, and recommend periodic surveys and analysis with different cohorts to track changes in health-seeking experiences over time.

In a paper published in proceedings to the 2010 ACM Special Interest Group on Information Retrieval Conference, the authors present research on predicting escalations in medical concerns based on the structure and content of Web pages encountered during medical search sessions. They construct and then characterize the performance of classifiers that predict whether an escalation will occur in issued queries following the visit to a page. Their findings show that features such as serious illness preceding benign explanations in page (e.g., cancer is mentioned before caffeine in pages pertaining to headaches), serious illness vs. benign explanation appears in page title or near beginning of page, page from Web forum, and page has external verification are all important predictors of subsequent escalation (or non-escalation).

=== Costs on healthcare systems ===
A study by researchers from Imperial College London published in September 2018 concluded that the condition is leading to a health anxiety epidemic in the UK. According to the authors, one in five appointments at the UK's National Health Service (NHS) is now related to internet-induced irrational fears about one's state of health. The study estimated the costs to the public healthcare system of such visits to be at £420 million per year "in outpatient appointments alone, with millions more spent on needless tests and scans".

=== Remedies ===
A paper from the Royal College of Surgeons in Ireland suggested that doctors annotate diagnoses posted online with complementary information, including statistics elaborating on incidence and prevalence. This was proposed as a potential means to alleviate online-induced health anxiety by placing the diagnosis into a wider context.

== Medical websites ==
In 2002 the Sydney Morning Herald wrote "a visit to an Internet clinic will probably diagnose drowsiness as chronic fatigue, anal itch as bowel cancer and a headache as a tumour." Many reputable medical organizations maintain websites that may include brief overviews of various conditions for individuals with a general curiosity, or more detailed information to aid the understanding of people who have been properly diagnosed. Often listing diagnoses without regard to incidence, prevalence, or relevant risk factors, websites may lead users to suspect rather rare and unlikely diseases as the source of their complaints. Since many benign conditions share symptoms with more serious ailments and are listed side-by-side, users without proper medical consultation may assume the worst rather than the likely diagnosis. Web-diagnosis can cause a great deal of distress and anxiety in users who believe themselves to have incurable and serious illnesses.

== AI chatbots ==
Large language model (LLM) driven chatbots have been cited as contributors to cyberchondriasis. The agreeable and personalized nature of responses generated by LLMs may affirm self-diagnoses and perpetuate health-related obsessions.

== Opening lines of communication ==
Some medical practitioners are open to a patient's personal research, as this can open lines of communication between doctors and patients, and prove valuable in eliciting more complete or pertinent information from the patient about their present condition.

Other doctors express concern about patients who self-diagnose on the basis of information obtained from the Internet when the patient demonstrates an incomplete or distorted understanding of other diagnostic possibilities and medical likelihoods. A patient who exaggerates one set of symptoms in support of their self-diagnosis while minimizing or suppressing contrary symptoms can impair rather than enhance a doctor's ability to reach a correct diagnosis.

== See also ==
- Hypochondria
- Medical students' disease
- Self-diagnosis
- Somatosensory amplification
- WebMD#Criticism
