= Nosophobia =

Irrational fear of contracting a disease

- Specialty: Psychiatry

Nosophobia, also known as disease phobia or illness anxiety disorder, is the irrational fear of contracting a disease, a type of specific phobia. Primary fears of this kind are fear of contracting HIV infection (AIDS phobia or HIV serophobia), pulmonary tuberculosis (phthisiophobia), sexually transmitted infections (syphilophobia or venereophobia), cancer (carcinophobia), heart diseases (cardiophobia), COVID-19 (coronaphobia), and catching the common cold or flu.

The word nosophobia comes from the Greek νόσος nosos for "disease" and φόβος, phobos, "fear".

== Signs and symptoms ==
Nosophobia is listed under hypochondriacal disorders by the ICD-10, which are defined by having a persistent preoccupation with the possibility of having at least one serious and progressive physical disorders. Nosophobia is described as unfounded. Medical examination and reassurance is often sought, but may also be avoided. Avoidance of internal and external phobic stimuli is present. One case study describes a woman with a fear of heart disease (cardiophobia) who avoided people she thought were at risk of heart attacks and avoided food containing cholesterol. There are sometimes checking behaviors, such as examining the body for lesions that could be Kaposi's sarcoma seen in AIDS patients or spots that could be skin cancer.

== Possible causes ==
=== Psychodynamic theory ===
One theorized cause of nosophobia in medical students detailed in Hunter et al.'s study is based around psychodynamic theory. Any pre-existing "weaknesses, sensitivities or idiosyncrasies" react to the stresses and intense focus on the body, disease, and death that medical studies bring. Students identify familiar medical histories, such as of loved ones, past patients, or themselves, to current patients or the current self. Emotionally investing with patients causes medical students to fashion their escalating worries after memories of loved ones or previous patients.

=== Media influences ===
Older literature suggests a flawed understanding of diseases, caused by media such as newspaper articles or uneducated gossip, could evoke fears surrounding disease.

A review shows the trend between diseases commonly feared and their prevalence at the time. For example, a 1911 public education campaign about tuberculosis caused patients to present with phthisiophobia. Similarly, fear of AIDS was studied in 1991, during the HIV/AIDS epidemic which was commonly broadcast on radio and TV. Some nosophobia regarded bovine spongiform encephalopathy as the disease received during the mass media attention in the 1990s.

=== Family history ===
One study showed those with nosophobia are significantly more likely to be younger siblings than a control group and the general population. One theory is that younger siblings are raised by an older family and are therefore more likely to experience illness and death of ageing relatives. Younger siblings are more likely to report having coddling, overprotective parents (especially mothers), who show distress at injury or sickness, while also providing the reward of care and attention. Additionally, children were more likely to report the same kind of fear as their mothers. These children are said to become acutely aware and anxious of their "personal vulnerability" to disease and death. Significantly more participants in this study claimed to have sickness or low vitality as a child. For very specific phobias, such as carcinophobia, there is often a family or personal history of the disease. Both of these factors would impair confidence in "bodily health".

== Treatments ==
=== Behavioral treatment ===
A 1988 pilot study of behavioral treatment showed statistically significant improvements in fear and reduced impact in home and work life, with follow-up showing success in some after a median of five years after treatment. This study focused on reducing fear and abnormal behaviors like avoidance and reassurance-seeking. A similar 1991 study replicated these results with similar methods. Methods used included exposure to phobic stimuli, satiation (such as writing down fears in detail) and paradoxical intervention (such as exercising to "bring on a heart attack"). Reassurance-seeking was prevented by informing family and doctors to not entertain requests for reassurance.

=== Cognitive therapy ===
One patient in a case study was able to cease avoidance and rituals after completing a cognitive therapy session when behavioral therapy had failed. Methods changed beliefs by providing and discussing evidence. The patient's belief that he had AIDS fell from 95% to 30%.

=== Medical reassurance ===
While earlier literature cites medical reassurance as comforting for some varieties of nosophobia, and it is often sought, more recent sources say the fear tends to persist even after medical examination and reassurance. Some evidence suggests medical examination and reassurance may actually worsen fears in the long term.

== Differential diagnoses ==
Many terms have been used to describe the transient hypochondriasis and fears of illness developed during medical studies. Nosophobia has been used to refer to this, as well as medical student's disease, hypochondriasis of medical students, and medicalstudentitis.

=== Hypochondriasis ===
There is a "confusion over the classification" differences between nosophobia and hypochondriasis, especially as some definitions, such as the ICD-10, consider nosophobia to be a subsection of hypochondriasis.

Some authors have suggested that the symptoms seen in medical students should be referred to as "nosophobia" rather than "hypochondriasis", because the quoted studies show a very low percentage of hypochondriacal character of the condition.

One way nosophobia differs from hypochondriasis is in specificity. Nosophobia causes those affected to fear the general possibility to get an illness. In comparison, the ICD-10 definition of hypochondriasis includes the belief of the presence of a maximum of two diseases. Another difference is in the phobic quality. Nosophobia manifests itself in "attacks", instead of the continuous worries those with hypochondriasis experience. There are differences in behavior. Nosophobia is associated with avoidance of internal and external stimuli while hypochondriasis often results in reassurance-seeking and checking behaviours.

== Prevalence ==
Estimates of prevalence vary. Early research found that at least 70% of medical students at McGill University experience nosophobia at some point during their undergraduate degrees. Further research found that 79% of a random sample of medical students at the University of Southern California had a history of the phobia.

Relatively more recent evidence from the University of New Mexico supports earlier research with at least 70% of students showing symptoms of hypochondriasis using the Illness Behavior Questionnaire and the Illness Attitude Scales. Medical students were significantly more likely than a control group of law students to show nosophobia symptoms like health precautions (e.g. avoiding smoking).

== See also ==
- Hypochondria
- Medical students' disease
- Nosocomephobia, the excessive fear of hospitals
- List of phobias
