= Self-diagnosis =

Diagnosing oneself with a medical condition

Self-diagnosis is the process of diagnosing, or identifying, medical conditions in oneself. It may be assisted by medical dictionaries, books, resources on the Internet, past personal experiences, or recognizing symptoms or medical signs of a condition that a family member previously had or currently has.

Depending on the nature of an individual's condition and the accuracy of the information they access, self-diagnoses can vary greatly in their safety. Due to self-diagnoses' varied accuracy, public attitudes toward self-diagnosis include denials of its legitimacy and applause of its ability to promote healthcare access and allow for individuals to find solidarity and support. Furthermore, external influences such as marketing, social media trends, societal stigma around disease, and to which demographic population one belongs greatly affect the use of self-diagnosis.

== Appropriate use ==
Self-diagnosis is prone to error and may be potentially dangerous if inappropriate decisions are made, which can stem from broad or inaccurately applied symptoms as well as confirmation bias. Because of the risks, self-diagnosis is officially discouraged by physicians and patient care organizations. Physicians are also discouraged from engaging in self-diagnosis due to potential lack of objectivity. An inaccurate self-diagnosis—a misdiagnosis—can result in improper health care, including using the wrong treatment or not seeking care for a serious condition that was under-diagnosed. Further concerns include undermining physician authority, lacking an unbiased view of oneself, overestimating one's symptoms, or adopting a state of denial about these symptoms.

However, self-diagnosis may be appropriate under certain circumstances. The use of over-the-counter (non-prescription) medications is often involved in self-diagnosis for conditions that are unlikely to be serious and have a low risk of harm by incorrect medication. Some conditions are more likely to be self-diagnosed, especially simple conditions such as head lice and skin abrasions or familiar conditions such as menstrual cramps, headache or the common cold. During the COVID-19 pandemic, self-diagnosis through the use of self-testing kits became commonplace and endorsed by governments, the Centers for Disease Control and Prevention (CDC) providing guidelines by which the American public should go about self-testing.

Complex conditions, including conditions like ADHD in adults and autism spectrum disorder (ASD), are more difficult to self-diagnose accurately. Such self-diagnoses are complicated by multiple factors, such as direct-to-consumer marketing of medications, which is widely criticized for promoting inappropriate self-diagnosis. Additionally, especially among younger generations, access to social media and the Internet has increased the ease with which individuals can access symptom lists and self-diagnose themselves with these complex conditions, potentially inaccurately.

== Influencing factors ==
=== Marketing ===
==== Direct-to-consumer advertising ====
Pharmaceutical and medical companies consider self-diagnosis in their marketing strategies as a means of connecting with their consumer base. Pharmaceutical companies have put a considerable amount of funding into marketing campaigns, which a 2007 study linked to an increase in seemingly healthy patients seeking out more diagnostic screenings. Specific marketing campaigns, termed disease awareness campaigns, disseminate information about a certain condition to consumers, rather than specific patients already diagnosed, and promote specific drugs developed by a pharmaceutical company as a remedy for said condition.

Often, these campaigns are proliferated through the creation of unbranded websites with checklists of ambiguous and broad symptoms that are stated to be representative of a specific disease, which has caused the American Medical Association (AMA) to warn doctors of this form of direct-to-consumer advertising. The AMA's concern was that the symptom checklists state that a widely applicable set of symptoms are indicative of a specific condition, improperly educating consumers about the disease and convincing them to adopt that diagnosis for a condition they may not have. Ebling assesses that naming the disease gives it an increased authenticity that merits a medical solution, which the websites present to be a specific, branded drug, all without appearing to be obviously sponsored. Medical professionals have taken concern with this promotion of a medical solution, accusing it to be a means of profiting off of consumers who are attempting to treat a condition they may not have. Doctors further criticize these campaigns for being misleading because they also often use language that celebrates the agency a patient is assuming over themselves by gaining this knowledge and seeking out a solution.

These ambiguous symptom checklists have been mirrored by advertisements by medical brands on TikTok that present their content as traditional influencer posts, then asking users if they exhibit any symptoms that could be applied to various conditions, such as "Are you nervous?" From this point, like the websites, these advertisements encourage users to empower themselves to address a specific condition they might have by using the company's services, which may include consultations or specific medications.

However, there is no consensus among studies as to whether exposure to direct-to-consumer advertising leads to a higher rate of requesting brand-name drugs.

==== Premenstrual dysphoric disorder (PMDD) ====
The pharmaceutical industry has also played a role in promoting drugs that treat premenstrual dysphoric disorder (PMDD). Sarafem, a differently-branded version of Prozac, which is used to treat depression, was created during the time when Prozac's patent was soon to expire. United States patent law required Eli Lilly and Company, Prozac's developer, to present a new use for the drug to extend their patent. Ebling states that Eli Lilly sought out doctors who would support the designation of PMDD as its own disease, resulting in FDA recognition of the condition and approval of Sarafem to serve as a treatment for it. The company succeeded in avoiding the competition that would have been generated by the production of a generic version of Prozac.

Since then, PMDD has become more commonly recognized, now having its own category in the DSM-V. However, it is still not consistently recognized among healthcare professionals due to some doctors still considering it a contested condition.

==== Self-diagnosis kits ====
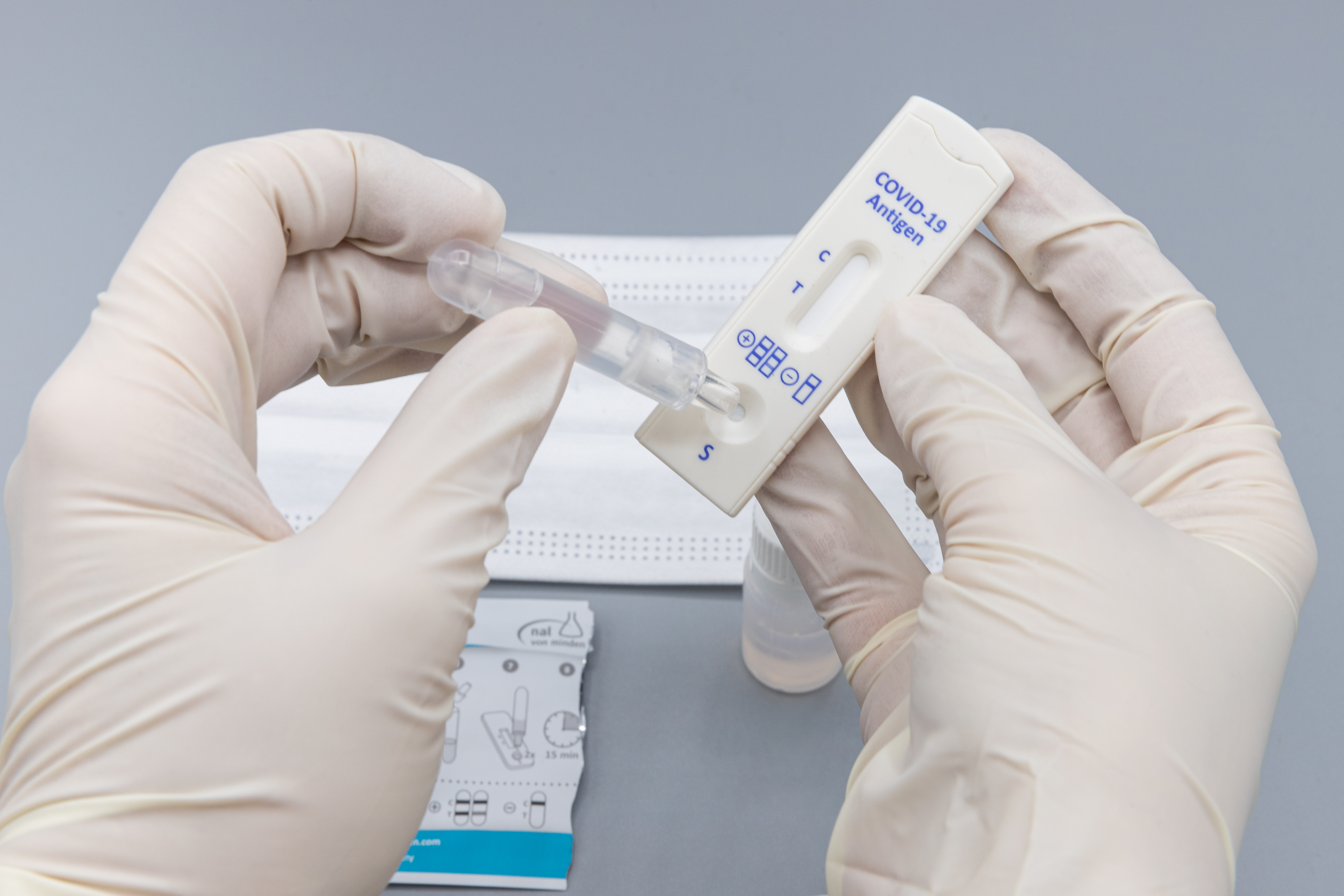
An antigen rapid test that can be used at home for those trying to assess if they have COVID-19.

Self-diagnosis itself is becoming a more lucrative industry given the popularity of self-testing kits. While these are most commonly associated with COVID-19, self-testing kits exist for a wide range of conditions, such as prostate cancer, Alzheimers, and menopause. Though healthcare professionals warn of their potential to be unreliable, these kits appeal to the public due to their easy use, convenience, and inexpensiveness. Despite the fact that doctors warn that they cannot necessarily conclusively diagnose a condition nor encapsulate a disease's full complexity, the industry creating these tests is growing in profitability.

==== Smartphone applications ====
Developers of medical diagnosis applications can also be fueled by commercial interests. A number of applications receive monetary returns for acting as referrals to health insurance companies, doctor's offices, and pharmacies. These forms of monetary compensation are often not mentioned in the app's contents or general overview.

=== The role of stigma ===
==== Public stigma ====
Though self-diagnosis may work to counter the stigma associated with disease, it faces its own share of public disapproval. Those who publish posts encouraging self-diagnosis do not always have verified medical credentials even though they often present their posts as providing expert advice. As a result, self-diagnoses are not always accepted by the public because they can be seen as misleading (see later section on Use of Social Media and Webpages).

Medical experts are concerned that self-diagnosis can overemphasize and enforce stereotypical perceptions of a disorder, positing that social media posting can ignore the medical complexity of physical and mental health disorders.

==== Support ====
Self-diagnosis can provide a reprieve from societal stigma surrounding mental illness. An individual who diagnoses themselves with a condition is able to seek out online communities of others with the same condition, providing them with a sense of recognition and belonging. On TikTok, those who deem themselves to exhibit traits of conditions such as obsessive-compulsive disorder, dissociative identity disorder, and ASD have found communities of support. Similarly, specific online communities exist for autistic people, which autistic adults report as assisting with combatting feelings of not fitting in prior to being able to identify with the disorder. Communities for health problems not necessarily recognized by the medical establishment also exist online with the same purpose of providing support and understanding.

Relatedly, self-diagnosis can foster a sense of self-understanding that promotes self-acceptance in the face of harsh social norms. This has been particularly influential for autistic people. Autistic people may display different behaviors than non-autistic individuals, prompting autistic people to feel "othered." Without an explanation as to why they may feel different than others, they have a higher likelihood of feeling confused and having low self-esteem, studies linking delayed diagnosis in autistic individuals with higher rates of anxiety, depression, and suicidal tendencies. Autistic adults also often face barriers and deterrents to receiving a formal diagnosis, especially if they are from a marginalized community. However, advocates for self-diagnosis posit that with an explanation, autistic people can understand why they may feel different, alleviating this burden. This understanding can also promote a greater comprehension of their strengths, weaknesses, and symptoms, allowing them to better navigate everyday life.

Additionally, social media users argue that the prevalence of self-diagnosis has promoted an open discussion surrounding mental health, working to remove the stigmas from various diseases and conditions. Online discussion of self-diagnosis has also been espoused as a tool to provide the benefits of a diagnosis to those who face financial or geographic boundaries to receiving a professional diagnosis.

=== Prevalence of the internet ===
The Internet and other connected resources have become popular places to start the self-diagnosis process. The availability of medical information online allows patients to have greater access to medical knowledge.

==== Smartphone applications ====
There are a multitude of medical and health apps available on both the Apple App Store and Google Play Store that can be used for self-diagnosing purposes. Approximately 20% of smartphone users have a health-related application downloaded onto their device.

Experts have criticized the creators of such medical apps as promoting a false sense of credibility in order to increase the number of downloads. For example, these apps will often use widely recognized medical symbols such as the red cross or a stethoscope on their thumbnails and diagnostic pages, as well as emphasize terms such as "algorithm", "sensors", and "computer" in the diagnosis process to convey a sense of scientific objectivity. Lupton and Jutel, in their analysis of 35 self-diagnosis apps, argue that these techniques portray self-diagnosis apps as having an augmented authority in determining diagnoses.

In relation to the amount of power that health-related smartphone apps have in determining a diagnosis, researchers have emphasized the importance of using such apps judiciously. In order to maintain a balance between patient agency and professional medical authority, many self-diagnosis applications remind users of the incomplete medical certainty of the diagnosis provided and to encourage them to obtain secondary professional medical advice from a doctor or specialist. Additionally, the sources of application diagnosis information can often be difficult to determine or verify. There have been cases where certain health-related applications made claims to receiving significant contributions of content from prestigious educational institutions to increase downloads, but little information was provided as to the extent and verifiability of such contributions.

==== Use of chatbots ====
A recent technology that has started to take hold in the realm of self-diagnosis is the utilization of chatbot-based symptom checker (CSC) applications. CSCs were designed to combat the problem of extended wait times to see a doctor and the unavailability of punctual medical advice. Patients have also utilized chatbots to determine severity of their potential diagnosis before going through the process of seeing a doctor and incurring the financial strain that can come with it. Chatbots utilize artificial intelligence (AI) in order to assist patients in their medical concerns during all hours of the day. The operational mechanism of CSCs is a text-to-text system, where the chatbot asks a series of health-related questions in order to determine a diagnosis. The effectiveness of chatbots in the process of self-diagnosis is still highly debated among researchers.

Studies have found that users have varying opinions on the required input for chatbot websites and applications. In some cases, chatbots offer limited space to input multiple symptoms and locations of symptoms for diagnosis determination. Interfaces have presented users with a "pre-structured symptom selection list" which has forced users to be more general with their responses than they would prefer. Other users have felt that questions asked by self-diagnosing chatbots require too much detail, leaving them confused or overwhelmed.

People are also using AI chatbots for self-diagnosis.

==== Social media ====
Social media has started to take on a particularly important role in the process of self-diagnosis, especially the diagnosis of mental health disorders. Social media users seeking answers often self-diagnose after resonating with a particular trait of a disorder that has been mentioned in a social media post. Self-diagnosis through social media is generally more prevalent in individuals who have obsessive–compulsive disorder (OCD), anxiety, depression, or other complex trauma.

Increased access to the ability to self-diagnose via the Internet can have benefits for patient-doctor communication. By assessing a patient's self-diagnosis, a medical professional can see with which specific traits of a disease the patient identified and can work with them to create a potentially more effective diagnosis and treatment.

Self-diagnosis through social media may have some drawbacks associated with it. Some social media postings can simplify a diagnosis, leading to a spread of misinformation about the emphasized disease. Some online self-diagnosis tests state that common, broad symptoms, like anxiety and mood swings, are definite indicators of specific disorders, causing social media users to report such posts for inaccuracy. People who publish health-related posts on the self-diagnosis of health issues may not have verified medical credentials even though they have posed their post as providing expert advice. Journalist and author Doreen Dodgen-Magee considers self-diagnosis tests to work due to confirmation bias, which was witnessed when there was a statistical increase in the number of teenage girls approaching their doctors with a concern they had Tourette syndrome after multiple videos naming broad symptoms as signs of Tourettes went viral on TikTok.

== Impact on varying demographics ==
=== Ethnic and socio-economic backgrounds ===
==== Vulnerable demographics ====
Ani and Bazargan from the Department of Family Medicine and Research Centers in Minority Institutions found that accessibility, affordability, continuity of medical care, and financial strains are the primary factors that determine whether patients choose to use self-diagnose or formal diagnoses. By utilizing the Behavioral Model for Vulnerable Populations, the study sampled over 1,394 African American and Latino households. Apart from their minority ethnic status, the households also had the following intersectional identities: 89% were female, 50% were single-parent households, 60% had less than a high school education, 73% were unemployed, and 33% were non-English speakers. Throughout the research process, 43% of the participants reported that a physician had never diagnosed at least one of their illnesses. The study's results note the significant influence of socio-economic backgrounds on using self-diagnosis as a more efficient and accessible medical solution. The study, however, also raised a concern regarding self-diagnosis in minority communities. Results show that the possibility of seeking self-diagnosis was far more likely when there were noticeable symptoms than when the symptoms were non-noticeable. If regular health checks were not offered to these demographics, they most likely would not realize their health conditions until they become irreversible. Commenting on this unrepairable outcome, Pete Wharmby, author of two books about autism, expressed frustration for non-white autistic people: "Autism is often undiagnosed, especially in demographics that are not young white males. This means self-diagnosis is often a requirement to get an official diagnosis. Some cannot get this dx, but still, deserve to be heard."

==== COVID-19 pandemic ====
COVID-19 also contributed to the increase in self-diagnosis among minority populations. Samantha Artiga from the Kaiser Family Foundation reports that when statistics were corrected to account for differences in age by race and ethnicity, it became clear that Black, Hispanic, AIAN, and NHOPI persons had the highest rates of COVID-19 cases and deaths in compared to white people. These demographics had a correlated surge in self-diagnosed COVID-19 cases. The Conversation highlights how using internet resources to evaluate COVID-19 symptoms and self-triage was promoted during the pandemic, exhibiting how online health information gained new significance.

==== The benefits and costs for vulnerable demographics ====
This trend of turning to self-diagnosis among minorities can be potentially dangerous, given the unfiltered and unauthorized information online. A report from Psychreg criticizes self-diagnosis for its potentially hazardous nature, reporting that 61% of the advice on social media (specifically, TikTok) is incorrect. The Camber Mental Health Organization also notes the potential danger of online self-diagnosis, indicating that influencers without proper license offer public advice that can further jeopardize the vulnerable demographics.

Other studies present non-dangerous aspects of self-diagnosis for these populations. A new study published by the Department of Public Health and Primary Care at Leiden University Medical Centre explains that patients use the internet to find reliable medical information about minor ailments and thus prevent symptoms from worsening if immediate health care cannot be provided. After surveying 1,372 participants, the study finds that most patients utilize this symptom-based approach. Suppose the patients expect the potential diagnosis to be more lethal. In that case, they tend to conduct further research on the internet to verify their suspicions about their condition.

=== Age ===
Younger generations are more likely to perform self-diagnosis. Kwakernaak explains their findings of a positive correlation between self-diagnosing accuracy and the age variable. There was an inverse relationship between age and accuracy; the younger the patient was, the more likely they would find high-quality websites for information. Kunst from Statista conducts a survey that presents the frequency data of each age group using apps for self-diagnosis. The group aged 18–19 years old were almost two times more likely to use the Internet regularly or occasionally compared to all the other age groups. The data showed that 10% of those in that age group used self-diagnosis regularly compared to 4% of respondents older than 61. The study posits that this frequent usage may explain why the younger population had more experience searching for high-quality websites and receiving accurate diagnoses. However, Kunst notes that this conclusion may be biased as the survey was conducted online and thereby only targeted respondents who had frequent access to the Internet.

Self-diagnosis does come with its negatives, and it is always possible that the individual diagnoses themselves with an incorrect illness or condition. However, many find that diagnosing themselves takes a great, heavy weight off of their shoulders. Instead of being forced to speak with healthcare providers, they use self-diagnosis as a way of saying, "I know myself better than anyone, and this is who I am." Often times, doctors and other professionals diagnose their patients incorrectly, simply because, although they are specialists, they do not feel and experience what the patient does. Self-diagnosis feels like a first breath of fresh air for many individuals.

== See also ==
- Cure
- Cyberchondria
- Home remedy
- Related mental disorders:
  - Delusional parasitosis
  - Hypochondria
  - Medical students' disease
  - Morgellons
- Therapy
