= Known-item search =

Known-item search is a specialization of information exploration which represents the activities carried out by searchers who have a particular item in mind. In the context of library catalogs, known‐item search means a search for an item for which the author or title is known. Although the concept of known-item search originated in library science, it is now applied in the context of web search and other online search activities. Known-item search is distinguished from exploratory search, in which a searcher is unfamiliar with the domain of their search goal, unsure about the ways to achieve their goal, and/or unsure about what their goal is.
