= Chirag Shah =

American computer scientist and professor of information science

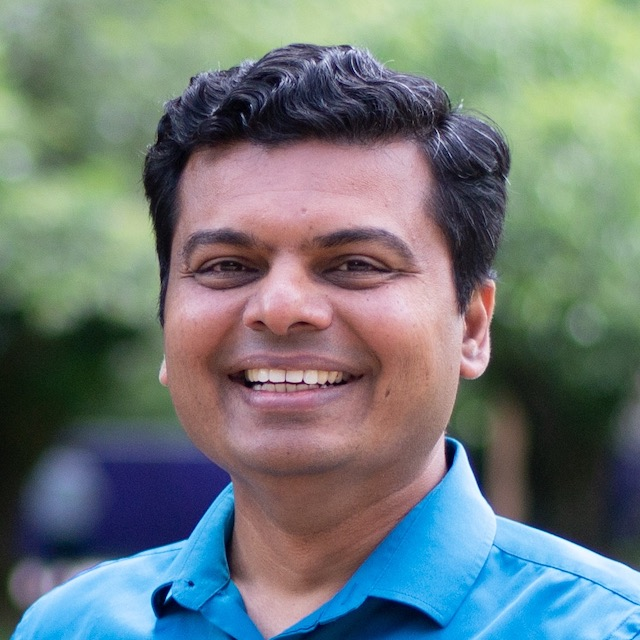
- Known for: Information seeking, Artificial intelligence, Societal implications of AI, Gender bias in AI search
- Awards: Research in Information Science Award (2024)

Academic background
- Education: Dharamsinh Desai Institute of Technology (BE) Indian Institute of Technology Madras (MTech) University of Massachusetts Amherst (MS) University of North Carolina at Chapel Hill (PhD)

Academic work
- Notable works: A Hands-on Introduction to Machine Learning (2023) A Hands-On Introduction to Data Science (2020) Information Access in the Era of Generative AI (2025)

Chirag Shah is an American computer scientist, author, and a university professor. He is known for his research in information science, particularly in areas such as information seeking, artificial intelligence, and the societal implications of AI systems. He is a professor at the University of Washington Information School, where he also co-directs the Center for Responsibility in AI Systems & Experiences (RAISE) and founded the InfoSeeking Lab. Shah was awarded the 2024 Research in Information Science Award by Association for Information Science & Technology (ASIS&T) for his contributions to the field.

== Education ==
Shah earned a Bachelor of Engineering in Computer Engineering from Dharamsinh Desai Institute of Technology, and a Master of Technology in Computer Science and Engineering from the Indian Institute of Technology Madras in 2002. He then did his Master of Science degree in Computer Science from the University of Massachusetts Amhers.

In 2010, he earned a PhD in Information Science from the University of North Carolina at Chapel Hill.

== Career ==
Shah's career started in 2010 as an Assistant Professor position at Rutgers University. In 2010, he also launched InfoSeeking Lab, which is currently located at the Information School at University of Washington. The lab conducts research and educational activities in the broader fields of Information and Data Sciences, with a particular focus on information seeking, retrieval, behavior, and artificial intelligence (AI). It has received more than $4 million USD in grants, including from Google, Amazon, Yahoo!, National Science Foundation (NSF), and Institute of Museum and Library Services (IMLS).

In 2019, Shah was hired by the University of Washington Information School as an associate professor and eventually became the founding co-director of the Center for Responsibility in AI Systems & Experiences (RAISE).

In 2022, Shah co-authored a study revealing that gender bias in image search results for occupations like "CEO" persists across major search engines, including Google, especially when additional terms like "United States" are included, despite previous claims of bias correction. Shah has expressed concerns regarding the reliability of AI-generated search summaries, noting that the integration of AI into search results could affect users' trust in the information provided.

== Honors and awards ==
- 2022: ACM Distinguished Member
- 2024: Research in Information Science Award

== Publications ==
=== Selected research articles ===
- 2010, C Shah, J Pomerantz, Evaluating and predicting answer quality in community QA. Proceedings of the 33rd international ACM SIGIR conference on Research and development in information retrieval
- 2010, B Sayre, L Bode, D Shah, D Wilcox, C Shah, Agenda setting in a digital age: Tracking attention to California Proposition 8 in social media, online news and conventional news, Policy and Internet
- 2024, S Verma, V Boonsanong, M Hoang, K Hines, J Dickerson, C Shah, Counterfactual explanations and algorithmic resources for machine learning: A review. ACM Computing Surveys

=== Books ===
- A Hands-on Introduction to Machine Learning (2023)– published by Cambridge University Press. ISBN 9781009123303
- Information Access in the Era of Generative AI (2025). ISBN 9783031421235
- Task Intelligence for Search and Recommendation (2021) – co-authored with Ryen W. White, published by Springer. ISBN 9783031011986''
- A Hands-On Introduction to Data Science (2020) – published by Cambridge University Press. ISBN 9781108472449
- Interactive IR User Study Design, Evaluation, and Reporting (2019) – published by Morgan & Claypool Publishers. ISBN 9781681735818
- Social Information Seeking: Leveraging the Wisdom of the Crowd (2017) – published by Springer. ISBN 9783319567556
- Collaborative Information Seeking: Best Practices, New Domains and New Thoughts (2014) – co-edited with Preben Hansen and Claus-Peter Klas, published by Springer. ISBN 9783319185415
- Collaborative Information Seeking: The Art and Science of Making the Whole Greater than the Sum of All (2012) – published by Springer. ISBN 9783642288128
