= Hypochondria =

Excessive fear of developing illness

Hypochondriasis
- Other names: Hypochondria, health anxiety, illness anxiety disorder
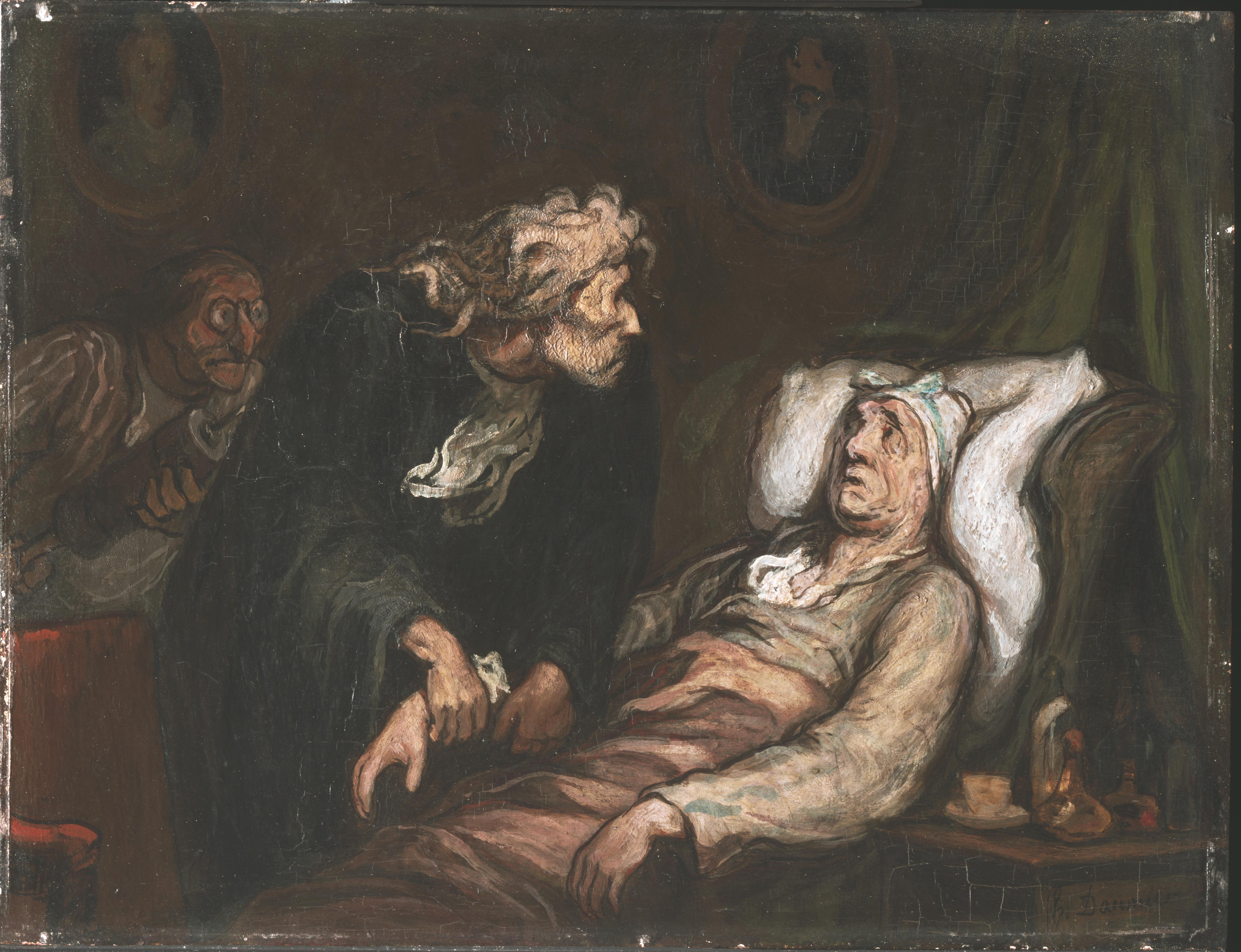
- Honoré Daumier, The Imaginary Illness (c. 1860–1862)
- Specialty: Psychiatry
- Symptoms: Excessive and persistent fear of, or preoccupation with, having or developing a severe illness; excessive health care seeking
- Usual onset: Early adulthood
- Differential diagnosis: Panic disorder, obsessive–compulsive disorder, generalized anxiety disorder
- Treatment: Cognitive behavioral therapy, medication
- Medication: Antidepressants
- Prognosis: ~50% meet criteria after ~1–5 years
- Frequency: ~5%

Hypochondriasis or hypochondria is a condition in which a person is excessively and unduly worried about having a serious illness. Hypochondria is an old concept whose meaning has repeatedly changed over its lifespan. It has been claimed that this debilitating condition results from an inaccurate perception of the condition of body or mind despite the absence of an actual medical diagnosis. An individual with hypochondriasis is known as a hypochondriac. Hypochondriacs become unduly alarmed about any physical or psychological symptoms they detect, no matter how minor the symptom may be, and are convinced that they have, or are about to be diagnosed with, a serious illness.

Often, hypochondria persists even after a physician has evaluated a person and reassured them that their concerns about symptoms do not have an underlying medical basis or, if there is a medical illness, their concerns are far in excess of what is appropriate for the level of disease. Many hypochondriacs focus on a particular symptom as the catalyst of their worrying, such as gastro-intestinal problems, palpitations, or muscle fatigue. To qualify for the diagnosis of hypochondria the symptoms must have been experienced for at least six months.

The ICD-10 classifies hypochondriasis as a mental and behavioral disorder, while the DSM-IV-TR defines it as a somatoform disorder. One study has shown it to affect about 3% of the visitors to primary care settings. The 2013 DSM-5 replaced the diagnosis of hypochondriasis with the diagnoses of somatic symptom disorder (75%) and illness anxiety disorder (25%).

Hypochondria is often characterized by fears that minor bodily or mental symptoms may indicate a serious illness, constant self-examination and self-diagnosis, and a preoccupation with one's body. Many individuals with hypochondriasis express doubt and disbelief in the doctors' diagnosis, and report that doctors' reassurance about an absence of a serious medical condition is unconvincing, or short-lasting. Additionally, many hypochondriacs experience elevated blood pressure, stress, and anxiety in the presence of doctors or while occupying a medical facility, a condition known as "white coat syndrome". Many hypochondriacs require constant reassurance, either from doctors, family, or friends, and the disorder can become a debilitating challenge for the individual with hypochondriasis, as well as their family and friends. Some individuals with hypochondria completely avoid any reminder of illness, whereas others frequently visit medical facilities, sometimes obsessively. Some may never speak about it.

People with hypochondriasis have a five-year shorter life expectancy.

== Signs and symptoms ==
Hypochondriasis is categorized as a somatic amplification disorder—a disorder of "perception and cognition"—that involves a hyper-vigilance of situation of the body or mind and a tendency to react to the initial perceptions in a negative manner that is further debilitating. Hypochondriasis manifests in many ways. Some people have numerous intrusive thoughts and physical sensations that push them to check with family, friends, and physicians. For example, a person who has a minor cough may think that they have tuberculosis. Or sounds produced by organs in the body, such as those made by the intestines, might be seen as a sign of a very serious illness to patients dealing with hypochondriasis.

Other people are so afraid of any reminder of illness that they will avoid medical professionals for a seemingly minor problem, sometimes to the point of becoming neglectful of their health when a serious condition may exist and go undiagnosed. Yet others live in despair and depression, certain that they have a life-threatening disease and no physician can help them. Some consider the disease as a punishment for past misdeeds.

Hypochondriasis is often accompanied by other psychological disorders. Bipolar disorder, clinical depression, obsessive–compulsive disorder (OCD), phobias, and somatization disorder, panic disorder are the most common accompanying conditions in people with hypochondriasis, as well as a generalized anxiety disorder diagnosis at some point in their life.

Many people with hypochondriasis experience a cycle of intrusive thoughts followed by compulsive checking, which is very similar to the symptoms of obsessive–compulsive disorder. However, while people with hypochondriasis are afraid of having an illness, patients with OCD worry about getting an illness or of transmitting an illness to others. Although some people might have both, these are distinct conditions.

Patients with hypochondriasis often are not aware that depression and anxiety produce their own physical symptoms, and mistake these symptoms for manifestations of another mental or physical disorder or disease. For example, people with depression often experience changes in appetite and weight fluctuation, fatigue, decreased interest in sex, and motivation in life overall. Intense anxiety is associated with rapid heartbeat, palpitations, sweating, muscle tension, stomach discomfort, dizziness, shortness of breath, and numbness or tingling in certain parts of the body (e.g. hands, forehead, etc.).

If a person is ill with a medical disease such as diabetes or arthritis, there will often be psychological consequences, such as depression. Some even report being suicidal. In the same way, someone with psychological issues such as depression or anxiety will sometimes experience physical manifestations of these affective fluctuations, often in the form of medically unexplained symptoms. Common symptoms include headaches; abdominal, back, joint, rectal, or urinary pain; nausea; fever and/or night sweats; itching; diarrhea; dizziness; or balance problems. Many people with hypochondriasis accompanied by medically unexplained symptoms feel they are not understood by their physicians, and are frustrated by their doctors' repeated failure to provide symptom relief.

== Cause ==
The genetic contribution to hypochondriasis is probably moderate, with heritability estimates around 10–37%. Non-shared environmental factors (i.e., experiences that differ between twins in the same family) explain most of the variance in key components of the condition such as the fear of illness and disease conviction. In contrast, the contribution of shared environmental factors (i.e., experiences shared by twins in the same family) to hypochondriasis is approximately zero.

Although little is known about exactly which non-shared environmental factors typically contribute to causing hypochondriasis, certain factors such as exposure to illness-related information are widely believed to lead to short-term increases in health anxiety and to have contributed to hypochondriasis in individual cases. An excessive focus on minor health concerns and serious illness of the individual or a family member in childhood have also been implicated as potential causes of hypochondriasis. Underlying anxiety disorders, such as general anxiety disorder, also increases an individual's risk.

In the media and on the Internet, articles, TV shows, and advertisements regarding serious illnesses such as cancer and multiple sclerosis often portray these diseases as being random, obscure, and somewhat inevitable. In the short term, inaccurate portrayal of risk and the identification of non-specific symptoms as signs of serious illness may contribute to exacerbating fear of illness. Major disease outbreaks or predicted pandemics can have similar effects.

Anecdotal evidence suggests that some individuals become hypochondriac after experiencing major medical diagnosis or death of a family member or friend. Similarly, when approaching the age of a parent's premature death from disease, many otherwise healthy, happy individuals fall prey to hypochondria. These individuals believe they have the same disease that caused their parent's death, sometimes causing panic attacks with corresponding symptoms.

== Diagnosis ==
The ICD-10 defines hypochondriasis as follows:

A. Either one of the following:

- A persistent belief, of at least six months' duration, of the presence of a minimum of two serious physical diseases (of which at least one must be specifically named by the patient).
- A persistent preoccupation with a presumed deformity or disfigurement (body dysmorphic disorder).

B. Preoccupation with the belief and the symptoms causes persistent distress or interference with personal functioning in daily living and leads the patient to seek medical treatment or investigations (or equivalent help from local healers).

C. Persistent refusal to accept medical advice that there is no adequate physical cause for the symptoms or physical abnormality, except for short periods of up to a few weeks at a time immediately after or during medical investigations.

D. Most commonly used exclusion criteria: not occurring only during any of the schizophrenia and related disorders (F20–F29, particularly F22) or any of the mood disorders (F30–F39).

In the fifth version of the DSM (DSM-5), most who met criteria for DSM-IV hypochondriasis instead meet criteria for a diagnosis of somatic symptom disorder (SSD) or illness anxiety disorder (IAD).

=== Classification ===
The classification of hypochondriasis in relation to other psychiatric disorders has long been a topic of scholarly debate and has differed widely between different diagnostic systems and influential publications.

In the case of the DSM, the first and second versions listed hypochondriasis as a neurosis, whereas the third and fourth versions listed hypochondriasis as a somatoform disorder. The current version of the DSM (DSM-5) lists somatic symptom disorder (SSD) under the heading of "somatic symptom and related disorders", and illness anxiety disorder (IAD) under both this heading and as an anxiety disorder.

The ICD-10, like the third and fourth versions of the DSM, lists hypochondriasis as a somatoform disorder. The ICD-11, however, lists hypochondriasis under the heading of "obsessive–compulsive or related disorders".

There are also numerous influential scientific publications that have argued for other classifications of hypochondriasis. Notably, since the early 1990s, it has become increasingly common to regard hypochondriasis as an anxiety disorder, and to refer to the condition as "health anxiety" or "health related obsessive–compulsive disorder".

== Treatment ==
Approximately 20 randomized controlled trials and numerous observational studies indicate that cognitive behavioral therapy (CBT) is an effective treatment for hypochondriasis. Typically, about two-thirds of patients respond to treatment, and about 50% of patients achieve remission, i.e., no longer have hypochondriasis after treatment. The effect size, or magnitude of benefit, appears to be moderate to large. CBT for hypochondriasis and health anxiety may be offered in various formats, including as face-to-face individual or group therapy, via telephone, or as guided self-help with information conveyed via a self-help book or online treatment platform. Effects are typically sustained over time.

There is also evidence that antidepressant medications such as selective serotonin reuptake inhibitors can reduce symptoms. In some cases, hypochondriasis responds well to antipsychotics, particularly the newer atypical antipsychotic medications.

== Etymology ==
Among the regions of the abdomen, the hypochondrium is the uppermost part. The word derives from the Greek term ὑποχόνδριος hypokhondrios, meaning "of the soft parts between the ribs and navel" from ὑπό hypo ("under") and χόνδρος khondros, or cartilage (of the sternum). Hypochondria in Late Latin meant "the abdomen".

The term hypochondriasis for a state of disease without real cause reflected the ancient belief that the viscera of the hypochondria were the seat of melancholy and sources of the vapor that caused morbid feelings. Until the early 18th century, the term referred to a "physical disease caused by imbalances in the region that was below your rib cage" (i.e., of the stomach or digestive system). For example, Robert Burton's The Anatomy of Melancholy (1621) blamed it "for everything from 'too much spittle' to 'rumbling in the guts'".

Philosopher Immanuel Kant discussed hypochondria in his 1798 book Anthropology from a Pragmatic Point of View:

The disease of the hypochondriac consists in this: that certain bodily sensations do not so much indicate a really existing disease in the body as rather merely excite apprehensions of its existence: and human nature is so constituted – a trait which the animal lacks – that it is able to strengthen or make permanent local impressions simply by paying attention to them, whereas an abstraction – whether produced on purpose or by other diverting occupations – lessens these impressions, or even effaces them altogether.

== See also ==
- Nosophobia
- Cyberchondria
- Mithridatism
- Munchausen syndrome
- Nocebo
- Psychosomatic medicine
- Sickness behavior
- Somatoform disorder
- Somatosensory amplification
- Man flu
- The Imaginary Invalid
