= Gary Marchionini =

Information scientist

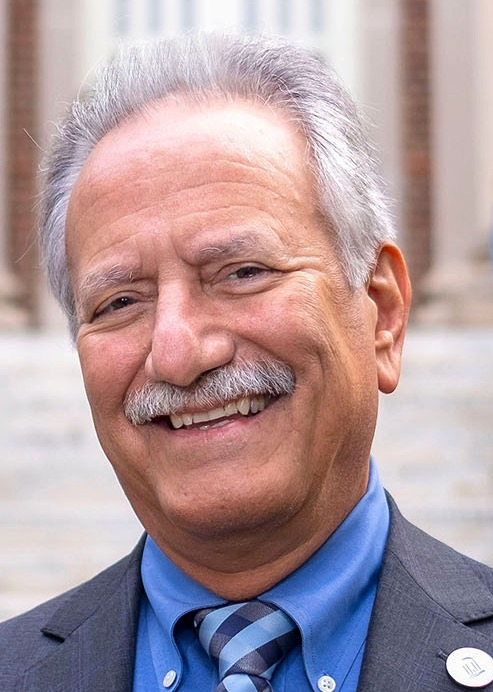
- Occupations: Information scientist, educator
- Known for: Interactive Information Seeking, Exploratory Search

Academic work
- Discipline: Information Science

Gary Marchionini is an information scientist and educator. His research focuses on human-information interaction, digital libraries and exploratory search. He is the Cary C. Boshamer Professor (emeritus)at the School of Information and Library Science at the University of North Carolina at Chapel Hill and served as Dean of the School from 2010-2024.

== Early life and education ==
Gary Marchionini was a first generation college student at Western Michigan University, where he double majored in Mathematics and English, earning a Bachelor's degree in 1971. He first became interested in programming while teaching mathematics at his old junior high school. The school presented him with four teletype machines and asked if he could do something with them. He began teaching his students programming and incorporating drill and practice exercises in his classes.

Marchionini served as math specialist at the Detroit Center for Professional Growth and Development (1978-1981) and received a PhD in 1981 from Wayne State University in "Curriculum Development: Mathematics Education". His thesis was titled Computer enhanced practice and introductory algebra.

== Work ==
Gary Marchionini is a leader in defining theory of human information interaction and exploratory search and his work sits at the intersection of human–computer interaction and information retrieval, a subdomain known as human–computer information interaction (HCIR). His 1995 book Information Seeking in Electronic Environments has been influential in shaping our understanding of search as a learning activity that is dependent not only on individual search capabilities and preferences but on the nature of the topical domain, the search task, and the features of the search system. A pioneer in the development of digital libraries, he led the development of one of the early digital video repositories, the Open Video Project and chaired the 2008 ACM/IEEE Joint Conference on Digital Libraries Conference and was program chair for the 2006 conference. His research has been supported by the U.S. National Science Foundation and several other foundations and corporate research laboratories.

Marchionini is the Cary C. Boshamer Professor (emeritus) and emeritus Dean of the School of Information and Library Science at UNC-Chapel Hill. He was professor at the University of Maryland information school and a member of the Human-Computer Interaction Laboratory (1983–1998). He served as President of the American Society for Information Science and Technology (2009–10) and received its Award of Merit in 2011. He served as Editor-in-Chief for the ACM Transactions on Information Systems Journal (2002–2008) and founding co-editor in chief for the Journal of Information Science Theory and Practice (2013-present) and for Data and Information Management (2017-2025). He is editor of the Springer Nature Synthesis Lecture Series, Information Concepts, Retrieval and Services.

== Awards ==
Marchionini has received numerous awards for his research. Some significant honors including the 2014 ASIST SIGUSE Outstanding Contributions to Information Behavior Award, the 2010 UNC Faculty Award for Excellence in Doctoral Mentoring, the 2000 American Library Association Library and Information Technology Association Frederick G. Kilgour Award for Research in Library and Information Technology, and the Best Paper of 1990, Journal of the American Society of Information Science for "Information Seeking Strategies of Novices Using a Full-Text Electronic Encyclopedia."
