= Ryen W. White =

Scottish-American computer scientist (born 1979)

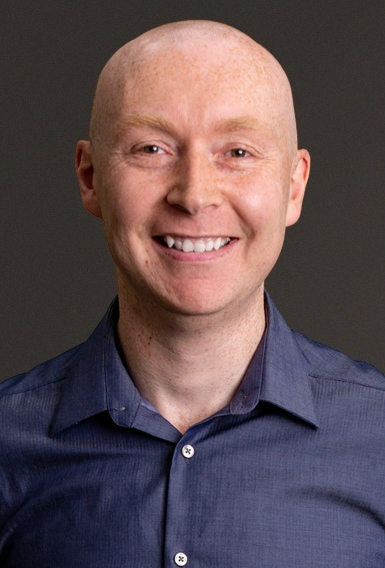
- Born: Ryen William White; 1979 (age 46–47)
- Education: University of Glasgow
- Known for: Exploratory Search; Cyberchondria
- Awards: BCS Distinguished Dissertation Award (2005); Karen Spärck Jones Award (2014); BCS Fellow (2016); ACM Fellow (2021); Tony Kent Strix Award (2022); SIGIR Academy (2023); SIGCHI Academy (2024)
- Scientific career
- Fields: Computer science Information Retrieval; Human-Computer Interaction; Healthcare
- Workplaces: University of Maryland; Microsoft Research
- Thesis: Implicit Feedback for Interactive Information Retrieval (2004)
- Doctoral advisor: Joemon Jose; Ian Ruthven; C. J. van Rijsbergen
- Website: ryenwhite.com

Ryen W. White (born 1979) is a Scottish-American computer scientist and technical leader at Microsoft in Redmond, WA, USA.. He is a Distinguished Scientist and a Vice President of Applied Science, currently leading the science organization for OneDrive and SharePoint. Ryen is known for his contributions to information retrieval, human-computer interaction, and computational health.

== Early life and education ==
Born in Scotland, White received his Ph.D. in computer science, specializing in information retrieval and human-computer interaction, from the University of Glasgow. His doctoral dissertation received the British Computer Society Distinguished Dissertation Award in 2005.

== Research interests ==
White's research has focused on search, digital assistance, and healthcare. He helped establish Exploratatory Search as a research area within Information Retrieval and did early work on Cyberchondria, Digital Disease Detection, and Pharmacovigilance. His current focus is on agentic AI, search, and knowledge systems.

== Awards and honors ==
White is a Fellow of the Association for Computing Machinery and the British Computer Society. Among other accolades, he has received three Best Paper awards and two Test of Time awards at the ACM SIGIR conference. White has also received the Karen Spärck Jones Award (2014) and the Tony Kent Strix Award (2022) for contributions to Information Retrieval research. He is a member of the SIGIR Academy and SIGCHI Academy. White's book entitled "Interactions with Search Systems" received the ASIS&T Best Information Science Book Award in 2017.

== Professional roles ==
White has served as program chair for The ACM Web Conference in 2019 and the ACM SIGIR Conference in 2017. He is the editor-in-chief of ACM Transactions on the Web and Vice Chair of SIGIR. White co-founded and chaired the inaugural steering committee for the ACM Conference on Computer Human Interaction and Retrieval (CHIIR). He founded the SIGIR Academy to recognize those making significant, cumulative contributions to the field of Information Retrieval, and SIGIR Futures, to support high-ambition, future-oriented research in information retrieval. White is also an affiliate professor at the University of Washington Information School and the University of Washington Paul G. Allen School of Computer Science & Engineering. He is also a Visiting Professor at the University of Glasgow School of Computing Science and the University of Strathclyde Department of Computer and Information Sciences.
