= Stephen Robertson (computer scientist) =

British computer scientist

- Born: 6 April 1946 (age 80)
- Education: Cambridge, City University, University College London
- Known for: Work on information retrieval and inverse document frequency
- Awards: Gerard Salton Award (2000), Tony Kent Strix award (1998), ACM Fellow (2013)
- Scientific career
- Fields: Computer science
- Doctoral advisor: B.C (Bertie) Brookes
- Website: staff.city.ac.uk/~sbrp622/

Stephen Robertson is a British computer scientist. He is known for his work on probabilistic information retrieval together with Karen Spärck Jones and the Okapi BM25 weighting model.

== Early life ==
Robertson was born in London, England, to (Theodosia) Cecil, née Spring Rice and Martin Robertson, a professor of classical Greek art and archaeology at the University of London, Oxford University, and Trinity College, Cambridge. His younger brother is composer and musician Thomas Dolby.

== Career ==
Robertson developed the Okapi BM25 weighting model, which is used in information retrieval systems and products, including open source search systems like Lucene, Lemur, Xapian, and Terrier. BM25 is used in large web search engines, certainly in Microsoft Bing, and probably in other web search engines too. BM25 is also used in various other Microsoft products such as Microsoft SharePoint and SQL Server.

After completing his undergraduate degree in mathematics at Cambridge University, he took an MS at City University, and then worked for ASLIB. He earned his PhD at University College London in 1976 under the renowned statistician and scholar B. C. Brookes. He then returned to City University working there from 1978 until 1998 in the Department of Information Science, continuing as a part-time professor and subsequently as professor emeritus. He is also a fellow of Girton College, Cambridge. Now retired, Robertson is professor emeritus at City University, and a visiting professor in the department of computer science at UCL.

== Publications ==
- Robertson, Stephen; Zaragoza, Hugo (2009). The Probabilistic Relevance Framework: BM25 and Beyond (PDF). NOW Publishers, Inc. ISBN 978-1-60198-308-4.
- Robertson, Stephen (2020). B C, Before Computers. Open Book Publishers. doi:10.11647/OBP.0225. ISBN 978-1-80064-029-0. S2CID 226361310.
