= Polycola =

Metasearch engine

PolyCola
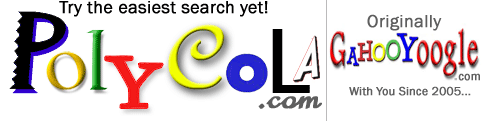
- Website type: Metasearch engine
- Available in: English
- Creator: Arbel Hakopian
- Website: http://www.PolyCola.com
- Launched: 2007
- Current status: Active

PolyCola, previously known as GahooYoogle, is a metasearch engine ( a search engine that searches multiple search engines at once) which was created by Arbel Hakopian.

It was started with the domain www.GahooYoogle.com in 2005. When it was first known to the public, it was discussed on BBC Radio, was chosen at HotSite by USA Today and managed to have entries on Fox News Channel. However, the site was shut down due to legal problems. GahooYoogle.com had a legal problem, so after the shut down, the site was moved to Yahoo! with the order made by the court after being an issue for a couple of years. After the shut down, the creator, Arbel Hakopian, decided to expand his original idea of GahooYoogle.com and came up with the idea of PolyCola.com; currently it is operating with the address www.polycola.com. The new and improved PolyCola.com lets searchers to minimize the time and problem they might have in using multiple search engines.

== Metasearch engine ==
PolyCola is a metasearch engine. A metasearch engine is a tool which lets you submit a word or phrase in the search box. Then it sends your search concurrently to other individual search engines which then sends it to its own databases. Within couple of seconds, you receive the result from several search engines. A metasearch engine only sends your search terms to databases of individual search engines; it does not have its own database of web pages.

Search engines are made up with three main parts. First, the search engine follows links on the web in order to request pages that are either not yet cataloged or have been updated. Then these pages are updated and added to the search engine index. The final part of a search engine is the search interface and relevancy software. Usually major search engines do not operate by allowing search of the actual web, but rather allow a search of a catalog of content that is slightly outdated. Each of the three parts that make up a search engine is able to do most of the following:

- Accept query; check for advanced matching or any misspelling to recommend for correct spelling
- Check for any query that might be related to other vertical search databases and place those related links to a small number of items
- Collect a list of relevant pages for the results. These are ranked based on content, link citation data and usage data.
- List related advertisements nearby.

== Technical details ==
PolyCola lets searchers to simultaneously search and compare results from major metasearch engines such as Google, Yahoo!, Live Search, Ask.com, Dogpile, AltaVista and AOL. PolyCola also has smart tool bar where searchers can choose results to be from general Web Browser to specific areas such as Images, Videos, News, Shopping, Directory, Answers and Blogs. The instruction to using PolyCola is very simple.

- PolyCola lets searchers to choose two search engines among listed above seven search engines
- Then you can select a search type from general Web Browser to Blogs as listed above
- Finally you can enter search word or phrase and click "PolyCola it!"
- The results are displayed on a page that is split into two which shows the results from two search engines that were chosen earlier. Each page can be scrolled independently so that comparing results from different metasearch engines can be easier.

== See also ==
- Google
- Yahoo!
- Bing
- Ask.com
- Dogpile
- AOL
- Metasearch engine
- MetaCrawler
- WebCrawler
- List of search engines
