= Search engine (computing) =

System to help searching for information

In computing, a search engine is an information retrieval software system designed to help find information stored on one or more computer systems. Search engines discover, crawl, transform, and store information for retrieval and presentation in response to user queries. The search results are usually presented in a list and are commonly called hits. The most widely used type of search engine is a web search engine, which searches for information on the World Wide Web.

A search engine normally consists of four components, as follows: a search interface, a crawler (also known as a spider or bot), an indexer, and a database. The crawler traverses a document collection, deconstructs document text, and assigns surrogates for storage in the search engine index. Online search engines store images, link data and metadata for the document.

== How search engines work ==
Search engines provide an interface to a group of items that enables users to specify criteria about an item of interest and have the engine find the matching items. The criteria are referred to as a search query. In the case of text search engines, the search query is typically expressed as a set of words that identify the desired concept that one or more documents may contain. There are several styles of search query syntax that vary in strictness. It can also switch names within the search engines from previous sites. Whereas some text search engines require users to enter two or three words separated by white space, other search engines may enable users to specify entire documents, pictures, sounds, and various forms of natural language. Some search engines apply improvements to search queries to increase the likelihood of providing a quality set of items through a process known as query expansion. Query understanding methods can be used as standardized query language.

Index-based search engine

The list of items that meet the criteria specified by the query is typically sorted, or ranked. Ranking items by relevance (from highest to lowest) reduces the time required to find the desired information. Probabilistic search engines rank items based on measures of similarity (between each item and the query, typically on a scale of 1 to 0, 1 being most similar) and sometimes popularity or authority (see Bibliometrics) or use relevance feedback. Boolean search engines typically only return items which match exactly without regard to order, although the term Boolean search engine may simply refer to the use of Boolean-style syntax (the use of operators AND, OR, NOT, and XOR) in a probabilistic context.

To provide a set of matching items that are sorted according to some criteria quickly, a search engine will typically collect metadata about the group of items under consideration beforehand through a process referred to as indexing. The index typically requires a smaller amount of computer storage, which is why some search engines only store the indexed information and not the full content of each item, and instead provide a method of navigating to the items in the search engine result page. Alternatively, the search engine may store a copy of each item in a cache so that users can see the state of the item at the time it was indexed or for archive purposes or to make repetitive processes work more efficiently and quickly.

Other types of search engines do not store an index. Crawler, or spider type search engines (a.k.a. real-time search engines) may collect and assess items at the time of the search query, dynamically considering additional items based on the contents of a starting item (known as a seed, or seed URL in the case of an Internet crawler). Meta search engines store neither an index nor a cache and instead simply reuse the index or results of one or more other search engine to provide an aggregated, final set of results.

Database size, which had been a significant marketing feature through the early 2000s, was similarly displaced by emphasis on relevancy ranking, the methods by which search engines attempt to sort the best results first. Relevancy ranking first became a major issue c. 1996, when it became apparent that it was impractical to review full lists of results. Consequently, algorithms for relevancy ranking have continuously improved. Google's PageRank method for ordering the results has received the most press, but all major search engines continually refine their ranking methodologies with a view toward improving the ordering of results. As of 2006, search engine rankings are more important than ever, so much so that an industry has developed ("search engine optimizers", or "SEO") to help web-developers improve their search ranking, and an entire body of case law has developed around matters that affect search engine rankings, such as use of trademarks in metatags. The sale of search rankings by some search engines has also created controversy among librarians and consumer advocates.

Google's "Knowledge Panel." This is how information from the Knowledge Graph is presented to users.

Search engine experience for users continues to be enhanced. Google's addition of the Google Knowledge Graph has had wider ramifications for the Internet, possibly even limiting certain websites traffic, for example Wikipedia. By pulling information and presenting it on Google's page, some argue that it can negatively affect other sites. However, there have been no major concerns.

== Search engine categories ==
=== Web search engines ===
Search engines that are designed for searching web pages, documents, and images were developed to facilitate searching through a large set of unstructured resources. They are engineered to follow a multi-stage process: crawling the stockpile of pages and documents to locate the search terms within their contents, indexing those pages, and resolving user entries/queries to return relevant results and links to those skimmed documents or pages from the inventory.

==== Crawl ====
In the case of a wholly textual search, the first step in classifying web pages is to find an ‘index item’ that might relate expressly to the ‘search term.’ In the past, search engines began with a small list of URLs as a so-called seed list, fetched the content, and parsed the links on those pages for relevant information, which subsequently provided new links. The process was highly cyclical and continued until enough pages were found for the searcher's use. These days, a continuous crawl method is employed as opposed to an incidental discovery based on a seed list. The crawl method is an extension of aforementioned discovery method.

Most search engines use sophisticated scheduling algorithms to “decide” when to revisit a particular page, to appeal to its relevance. These algorithms range from constant visit-interval with higher priority for more frequently changing pages to adaptive visit-interval based on several criteria such as frequency of change, popularity, and overall quality of site. The speed of the web server running the page as well as resource constraints like amount of hardware or bandwidth also figure in.

==== Link map ====
Pages that are discovered by web crawls are often distributed and fed into another computer that creates a map of resources uncovered. The bunchy clustermass looks a little like a graph, on which the different pages are represented as small nodes that are connected by links between the pages. The excess of data is stored in multiple data structures that permit quick access to said data by certain algorithms that compute the popularity score of pages on the web based on how many links point to a certain web page, which is how people can access any number of resources concerned with diagnosing psychosis. Another example would be the accessibility/rank of web pages containing information on Mohamed Morsi versus the very best attractions to visit in Cairo after simply entering ‘Egypt’ as a search term. One such algorithm, PageRank, proposed by Google founders Larry Page and Sergey Brin, is well known and has attracted a lot of attention because it highlights repeat mundanity of web searches courtesy of students that don't know how to properly research subjects on Google.

The idea of doing link analysis to compute a popularity rank is older than PageRank. However, In October 2014, Google’s John Mueller confirmed that Google is not going to be updating it (Page Rank) going forward. Other variants of the same idea are currently in use – grade schoolers do the same sort of computations in picking kickball teams. These ideas can be categorized into three main categories: rank of individual pages and nature of web site content. Search engines often differentiate between internal links and external links, because web content creators are not strangers to shameless self-promotion. Link map data structures typically store the anchor text embedded in the links as well, because anchor text can often provide a “very good quality” summary of a web page's content.

=== Database Search Engines ===
Searching for text-based content in databases presents a few special challenges from which a number of specialized search engines flourish. Databases can be slow when solving complex queries (with multiple logical or string matching arguments). Databases allow pseudo-logical queries which full-text searches do not use. There is no crawling necessary for a database since the data is already structured. However, it is often necessary to index the data in a more economized form to allow a more expeditious search.

=== Mixed Search Engines ===
Sometimes, data searched contains both database content and web pages or documents. Search engine technology has developed to respond to both sets of requirements. Most mixed search engines are large Web search engines, like Google. They search both through structured and unstructured data sources. Take for example, the word ‘ball.’ In its simplest terms, it returns more than 40 variations on Wikipedia alone. Did you mean a ball, as in the social gathering/dance? A soccer ball? The ball of the foot? Pages and documents are crawled and indexed in a separate index. Databases are indexed also from various sources. Search results are then generated for users by querying these multiple indices in parallel and compounding the results according to “rules.”

== History of search technology ==
=== The Memex ===
The concept of hypertext and a memory extension originates from an article that was published in The Atlantic Monthly in July 1945 written by Vannevar Bush, titled "As We May Think". Within this article Vannevar urged scientists to work together to help build a body of knowledge for all mankind. He then proposed the idea of a virtually limitless, fast, reliable, extensible, associative memory storage and retrieval system. He named this device a memex.

Bush regarded the notion of “associative indexing” as his key conceptual contribution. As he explained, this was “a provision whereby any item may be caused at will to select immediately and automatically another. This is the essential feature of the memex. The process of tying two items together is the important thing.

All of the documents used in the memex would be in the form of microfilm copy acquired as such or, in the case of personal records, transformed to microfilm by the machine itself. Memex would also employ new retrieval techniques based on a new kind of associative indexing the basic idea of which is a provision whereby any item may be caused at will to select immediately and automatically another to create personal "trails" through linked documents. The new procedures, that Bush anticipated facilitating information storage and retrieval would lead to the development of wholly new forms of the encyclopedia.

The most important mechanism, conceived by Bush, is the associative trail. It would be a way to create a new linear sequence of microfilm frames across any arbitrary sequence of microfilm frames by creating a chained sequence of links in the way just described, along with personal comments and side trails.

In 1965, Bush took part in the project INTREX of MIT, for developing technology for mechanization the processing of information for library use. In his 1967 essay titled "Memex Revisited", he pointed out that the development of the digital computer, the transistor, the video, and other similar devices had heightened the feasibility of such mechanization, but costs would delay its achievements.

=== SMART ===
Gerard Salton, who died on August 28 of 1995, was the father of modern search technology. His teams at Harvard and Cornell developed the SMART informational retrieval system. Salton's Magic Automatic Retriever of Text included important concepts like the vector space model, Inverse Document Frequency (IDF), Term Frequency (TF), term discrimination values, and relevancy feedback mechanisms.

He authored a 56-page book called A Theory of Indexing which explained many of his tests, upon which search is still largely based.

=== String Search Engines ===
In 1987, an article was published detailing the development of a character string search engine (SSE) for rapid text retrieval on a double-metal 1.6-μm n-well CMOS solid-state circuit with 217,600 transistors lain out on a 8.62x12.76-mm die area. The SSE accommodated a novel string-search architecture which combines a 512-stage finite-state automaton (FSA) logic with a content addressable memory (CAM) to achieve an approximate string comparison of 80 million strings per second. The CAM cell consisted of four conventional static RAM (SRAM) cells and a read/write circuit. Concurrent comparison of 64 stored strings with variable length was achieved in 50 ns for an input text stream of 10 million characters/s, permitting performance despite the presence of single character errors in the form of character codes. Furthermore, the chip allowed nonanchor string search and variable-length `don't care' (VLDC) string search.

== See also ==
=== By source ===
- Database search engine
- Desktop search
- Enterprise search
- Federated search
- Human search engine
- Metasearch engine
- Multisearch
- Search aggregator
- Web search engine

=== By content type ===
- Audio search engine
- Full text search
- Image search
- Video search engine

=== By interface ===
- Incremental search
- Instant answer
- Semantic search
- Selection-based search
- Voice Search

=== By topic ===
- Bibliographic database
- Enterprise search
- Medical literature retrieval
- Vertical search

=== Others ===
- Automatic summarization
- Emanuel Goldberg (inventor of early search engine)
- Index (search engine)
- Inverted index
- List of search engines
- Search as a service
- Search engine indexing
- Search engine optimization
- Search suggest drop-down list
- Solver (computer science)
- Spamdexing
- SQL
- Text mining
- Web crawler
- Word-sense disambiguation (dealing with Ambiguity)
