= Info.com =

Metasearch engine

- Website type: Web Search Engine
- Available in: English
- Owner: System1
- Website: www.info.com
- Launched: October 18, 2004; 21 years ago
- Current status: Active

Info is a metasearch engine, which as of 2013, provided results from search engines Google, Yahoo!, Ask, Bing, Yandex, and Open Directory. As of 2004, news search was powered by Topix.net, Info.com's web search engine information was powered by Shopping.com and Info.com had White Page and Yellow Page search. As of 2013, Info.com also had search plugins for Google Chrome, Internet Explorer and Firefox.

== History ==
Info.com launched on October 18, 2004 with $8 million in backing, primarily from angel investors. Info.com initially provided results from search engines and directories Google, Yahoo!, Ask, Teoma, AlltheWeb, Inktomi, Yandex, Open Directory, Kanoodle, LookSmart, and About.com.

In August 2016, the website had an estimated 13.5 million unique monthly visitors and was the tenth most popular search engine, ahead of DuckDuckGo, but behind InfoSpace and other more popular search engines such as Google.
