= FromAtoB.com =

Multimodal journey planner and online booking platform

fromAtoB GmbH
- Website type: GmbH
- Founded: Aachen, Germany 2008
- Area served: Europe
- Founders: Veit Blumschein, Johannes Graßmann, Daniel Nolte
- Industry: Travel, Travel technology, Travel services
- Products: Travel metasearch engine
- Current status: Inactive

fromAtoB.com was an intermodal journey planner and online booking platform for European travel, accessible via a web browser or mobile apps for Android and iOS. All relevant means of transportation such as train, airplane, bus, and carpool could be compared and combined within one trip. The company was founded in 2008, and was based in Berlin with an office in Aachen. Service ended on December 31, 2020 due to loss of revenue because of the COVID-19 pandemic, while AllRail, a trade association, attributes it to lack of real time data provided by European state railways.

== Data coverage ==
fromAtoB's travel metasearch engine was available in 15 countries and in 11 languages. The search engine was able to access information from more than 700 providers including Deutsche Bahn, Flixbus, Swiss Federal Railways, ÖBB, Renfe Operadora, Trenitalia, Eurowings, SNCF, Carpooling.com, and National Express Coaches. Tickets for Deutsche Bahn, Trenitalia, Eurowings and SBB could be booked directly through fromAtoB. If a user decided on a different provider, fromAtoB redirected to the provider's page and allowed the user to finish the booking there. Approximately 2.5 million users visited the site per month in 2013.

== History ==
The company was supported by the German Government and the EU Commission. fromAtoB was launched under the German name Verkehrsmittelvergleich.de by Dr. Veit Blumschein, Dr. Johannes Graßmann and Daniel Nolte as a spin-off from the RWTH Aachen University. They received further investment from various Business Angels including Seedfonds Aachen, French venture capital firm Seventure Partners and Daniel Wild, CEO of Ecommerce Alliance and Tiburon. Due to problems with intermediate financing, fromAtoB GmbH filed for insolvency in December 2017 and its assets were acquired by German gas station operator Tank & Rast. fromAtoB.com was subsequently run by Tank & Rast subsidiary Pinion Digital GmbH.
