= Netbot =

Netbot was the first commercial Internet price comparison service. Founded by University of Washington Computer Science professors Oren Etzioni and Daniel S. Weld the company was funded by ARCH Venture Partners, Alta Partners and the Madrona Venture Group, and the University of Washington was also a shareholder. Netbot introduced the Jango comparison shopping “agent” first as a browser plug-in and later, as a server product. In addition, the company operated MetaCrawler, a metasearch engine, before licensing it to Go2Net. In October 1997, Netbot was acquired by the Excite portal for $35M.
