= Marc Fest =

German-American programmer and journalist

Marc Fest.

Marc Fest (born 1966, in Münster, Germany) is a German-American communications professional, programmer and entrepreneur. He is notable as the creator of multiple web-based information management tools and a pioneer in this technology. He is a former journalist and self-taught programmer. His most recognized achievement is originating the concept known as "metabrowsing" through his creation of Quickbrowse.com in 1999. This is a Web-based subscription service that enables users to browse multiple web pages by combining them vertically into a single web page. This concept was an outgrowth of a tool which Fest had conceived as an aid to his journalistic research.

Between 1990 and 1999 Marc Fest worked for the publications Berliner Zeitung (1996–1999), die tageszeitung (1990 to 1995) and The Atlanta Journal-Constitution (1993) as part of an Arthur F. Burns Journalism Fellowship. At a party he mentioned his invention to financial writer Andrew Tobias, who began the process of providing seed money for what eventually became Quickbrowse. He was vice president of communications for the John S. and James L. Knight Foundation and the New World Symphony. Fest is CEO of social portal Joy.net. He is a dual Germany/United States citizen.

== Quickbrowse ==
Quickbrowse received wide media coverage during the height of the Dot-com bubble. It was quickly followed by other metabrowsers such as Octopus.com (backed by Netscape founder Marc Andreessen), Onepage.com (backed by Microsoft co-founder Paul Allen), iHarvest.com, Katiesoft.com and Calltheshots.com - all of which have ceased to operate as metabrowsers. Octopus received more than $11.4 million in venture capital funding from Redpoint Ventures. Onepage received $25 million in venture capital funding. Quickbrowse received a half-million dollars in angel funding. Quickbrowse backers included its lead investor, Geocities.com founder David Bohnett, the financial writer Andrew Tobias and CBS hurricane expert Bryan Norcross.

== Other Internet activities ==
Fest has created additional Web-based services, such as Onlinehomebase.com (information management), Magicminder.com (contact management), Trackle.com (Web page content monitoring), SimplyAnnual.com (yearly email reminders), and myHerald.com, an experimental online edition of the Miami Herald based on metabrowsing (discontinued). He is also the creator of Aftersunrise.com, a video blog of South Beach sunrises and of Messagehouse.org, a site about messaging tactics.

== Bibliography ==
- Stumbling into success: Techies generate buzz with Web-reading discovery”, Miami Herald, by John Dorschner, 11/23/99 - Fest as inventor
- Jim Regan - Site Reviews, Christian Science Monitor, 1/28/07 - Fest as inventor
- “The Mother of all Browser Windows is a Hit”, New York Post, By Joseph Gallivan - Fest as inventor
- “Save time by visiting website Quickbrowse”, The Johns Hopkins News-Letter, by Brian Kim, February 3, 2000 - Fest as inventor
- “Thanks a Million: Net Millionaires” Surfer's Digest, by Carla Sinclair & Matt Frauenfelder - Fest as inventor
- “Sun Salutations from a Survivor” South Florida Sun-Sentinel, by Margo Harakas, April 11, 2006 - Fest as inventor
- “Sunrise Snapshot” Miami Herald, by Nicholas Spangler, April 15, 2006 - Fest as inventor

== Publications by Fest ==
- Christian Heeb; Jörg von Uthmann; Marc Fest (1997). Edition USA - Traumziel Amerika (Dream Destination America), New York: Big Apple und Long Island. München: Bucher. ISBN 3-7658-1119-X.
