= System1 =

Advertising and digital assets holding company

System1, Inc.
- Formerly: OpenMail (2013–2017)
- Type: Public
- Traded as: NYSE: SST
- Industry: News media; Web security; Internet advertising
- Founded: 2013; 13 years ago in Venice Beach, California (as OpenMail)
- Headquarters: Marina del Rey, California, United States
- Key people: Michael Blend (Co-founder/CEO); Chuck Ursini (Co-founder/COO); Brian Coppola (CPO)
- Products: Answers.com, HowStuffWorks, Info.com, Infospace, MapQuest, Startpage
- Revenue: ▼US$266 million (2025)
- Net income: ▲ −US$65.3 million (2025)
- Website: system1.com

System1, Inc. is an American digital advertising and customer acquisition company. Formerly known as OpenMail, it was founded in 2013. It describes itself as operating a "Responsive Acquisition Marketing Platform", and cites privacy as one of its principal foci, although it has been criticized for its influence on privacy-focused properties, including search engine Startpage.com. It is headquartered in Marina del Rey, California.

== History ==
Michael Blend and Chuck Ursini founded the company in Venice Beach, California, in 2013.

In July 2016, Infospace and its subsidiaries HowStuffWorks, Dogpile, Zoo.com, MetaCrawler, and WebCrawler were bought by System1.

OpenMail rebranded as System1 shortly after April 2017. System1’s subsidiary, digital media publisher HowStuffWorks, also spun out as an independent podcast network in 2017.

In October 2019, System1 bought MapQuest from Verizon. Cory Doctorow opined, as soon as MapQuest was bought by AOL (which was later bought by Verizon), that it was "doomed to die". Verizon had dumped MapQuest to System1 for such a small sum, it was "not material enough for Verizon to file paperwork".

In February 2020, System1 acquired Waterfox; concern about the acquisition, as well as secrecy surrounding it, was expressed by the public. System1 also acquired a controlling share in privacy-focused search engine Startpage in 2020. The Waterfox and Startpage acquisition was done through System1's subsidiary Privacy One Group Ltd. Further clarification and communication happened after public concern about the acquisition grew.

In 2021, System1 announced that it would be going public on the New York Stock Exchange. The company also announced it would be combining with the SPAC Trebia Acquisition Corp. in a reverse merger. Through this deal, System1 also merged with the privacy subscription platform Protected.net. It officially went public on January 31, 2022. Protected.net would eventually rebrand as Total Security.

In February 2022, System1 acquired consumer mapping service RoadWarrior. In March 2022, System1 purchased online coupon provider CouponFollow in a deal worth up to $110 million.

In April 2022, Waterfox set Startpage as its default search engine, reflecting the ownership of System1.

In May 2022, in a quarterly earnings report, System1's acquisition of Answers.com was announced.

From 2022-2023, System1 was named a Microsoft Supply Partner of the Year in the Americas. Microsoft also gave System1 an Advertising Global Partner Award in 2023.

In July 2023, Waterfox became independent of System1. In October 2023, System1 announced a search partnership with European search engine Ecosia after Ecosia moved away from exclusively using Microsoft’s Bing. In November 2023, System1 also announced the sale of Total Security.

== Properties ==
- ActiveBeat
- Answers.com
- CouponFollow
- Dogpile
- HowStuffWorks
- Info.com
- MetaCrawler
- MapQuest
- StartPage.com
- WalletGenius
- WebCrawler
- Zoo.com

=== Former properties ===
- Total Security
- Waterfox
