= Sesat =

Sesat may refer to one of the following.

- Seshat, ancient Egyptian goddess of wisdom
- Seshat (project), an international scientific research project
- SESAT, a satellite owned by Eutelsat
- Sesam Search Application Toolkit, a platform for federated search
