= Gopili =

Travel metasearch engine

Gopili is a travel metasearch engine launched in UK in December 2014. The website compiles and presents data on domestic and international travel.

Gopili is the European brand of KelBillet, which is a multimodal travel search engine in France. Gopili’s website is today available in UK, Spain, Germany, Italy and Russia.

The website has headquarters in Rennes, France.
