= SearchTempest =

- Website type: Web Application
- Owner: SearchTempest Online Inc.
- Creator: Nathan Stretch
- Website: SearchTempest.com
- Launched: 2006
- Current status: Active

SearchTempest is an aggregator of online classified advertisements that allows users to search results from craigslist, eBay, and Amazon.com together.

Created in 2006 by Nathan Stretch, SearchTempest was originally named Craig's Helper and was made to help users search more than one craigslist city at once. Eventually, Craig's Helper's name was changed to SearchTempest and began to search eBay and Amazon as well.

In 2007 the offshoot AutoTempest, originally called Hank´s Helper, was created as a specialized aggregator of online classified advertisements for cars.

In 2010, time saving blog LifeHacker recommended SearchTempest to their readers.

== AutoTempest ==
AutoTempest is an aggregator of online classified advertisements specifically for cars, that searches craigslist, eBay Motors, AutoTrader.com, Cars.com, Auto Trader (Canada), and others.

Created in 2007, AutoTempest started out as Hank's Helper, an offshoot of SearchTempest (Craig's Helper at the time) as a way of providing a specialized experience for all the used car shoppers visiting SearchTempest.
