= Bob Rosenschein =

American-Israeli internet entrepreneur (born 1953)

- בּוֹבּ רוזנשיין
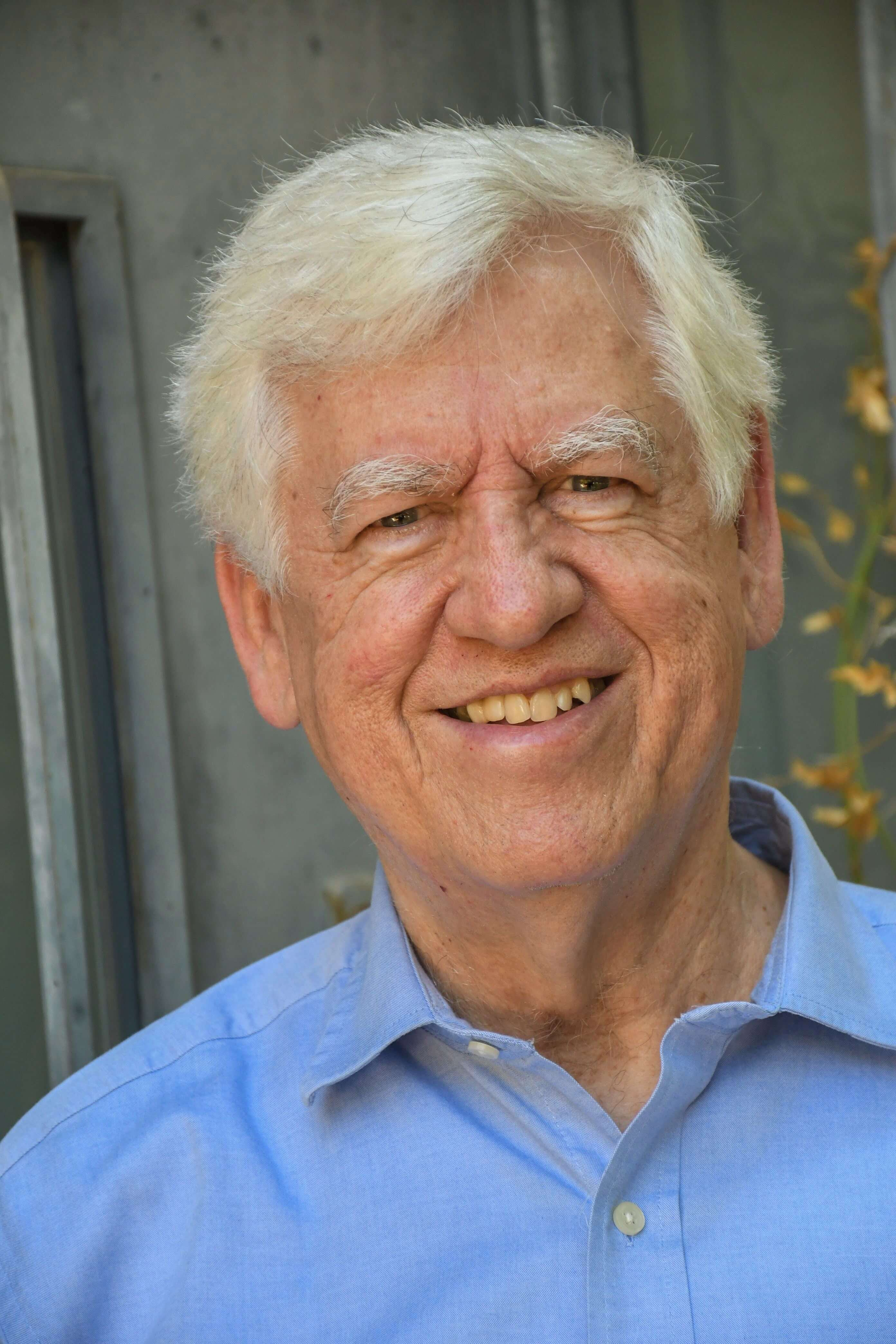
- Robert S. ("Bob") Rosenschein, August 2025
- Born: Robert Rosenschein; June 5, 1953 (age 73); Harrisburg, Pennsylvania, USA
- Occupation: Businessman
- Known for: Founder of Answers.com
- Website: bobr.com

Robert Samuel ("Bob") Rosenschein (Hebrew: בּוֹבּ רוֹזֶנְשַׁיין) is an American-Israeli internet entrepreneur and longtime contributor to the Israeli startup ecosystem.

He is known for helping Microsoft create Hebrew and Arabic Windows, and as the founder of Answers.com [NASDAQ:ANSW], which was bought by Summit Partners’ AFCV Holdings for $127 million. As a tech founder, he has built and exited several ventures, including one of the earliest web-based answer engines.

== Early life and education ==
Rosenschein was born in Harrisburg, Pennsylvania to Jewish parents Martin Rosenschein and Yolanda Bleier, who had survived the Holocaust in Europe. He attended elementary school at Silver Academy and public Susquehanna Township High School, spending summers at Camp Ramah.

He graduated with a BSc in Computer Science from the Massachusetts Institute of Technology in 1976.

== Career ==
=== Early career ===
In his early career, Rosenschein worked for Data General, American Management Systems, the World Bank Group, and Ashton-Tate. He moved to Israel in 1983, where he worked as a software consultant.

=== Kivun / Dagesh / Hebrew Windows / Accent ===
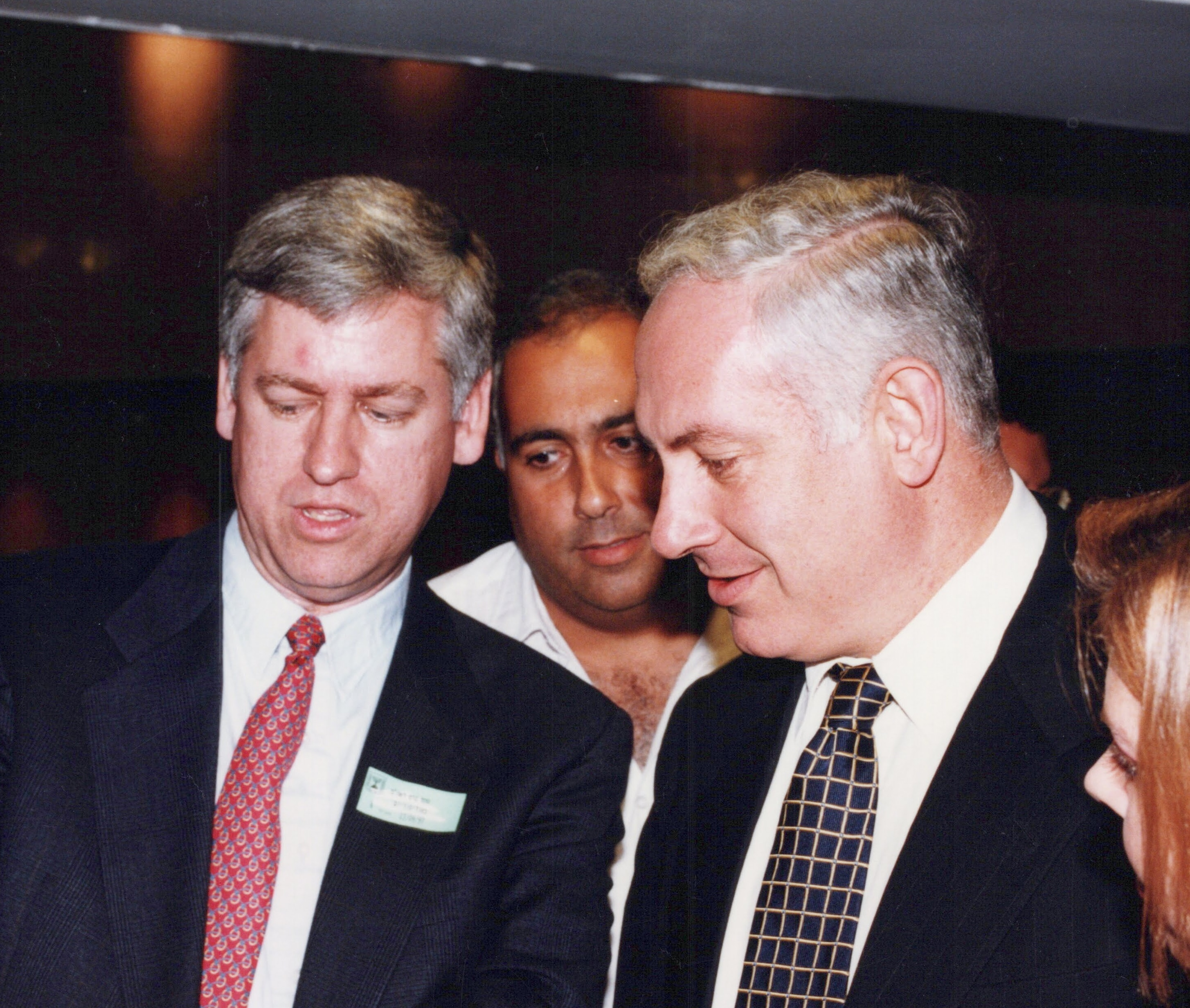
Receiving Prime Minister's Award from Benjamin Netanyahu

In 1988, Rosenschein co-founded with his brother, Professor Jeffrey Rosenschein the software firm Kivun, later Accent Software. It was the earliest developer of Microsoft Windows software in Israel. The idea was sparked by a chance meeting with Bill Gates. The company created “Dagesh”, the first Hebrew/English Windows word processor, and other multilingual tools under the “Accent” brand. The company consulted to Microsoft in the early 1990s on the creation of Hebrew and Arabic Windows editions.

=== Answers.com ===
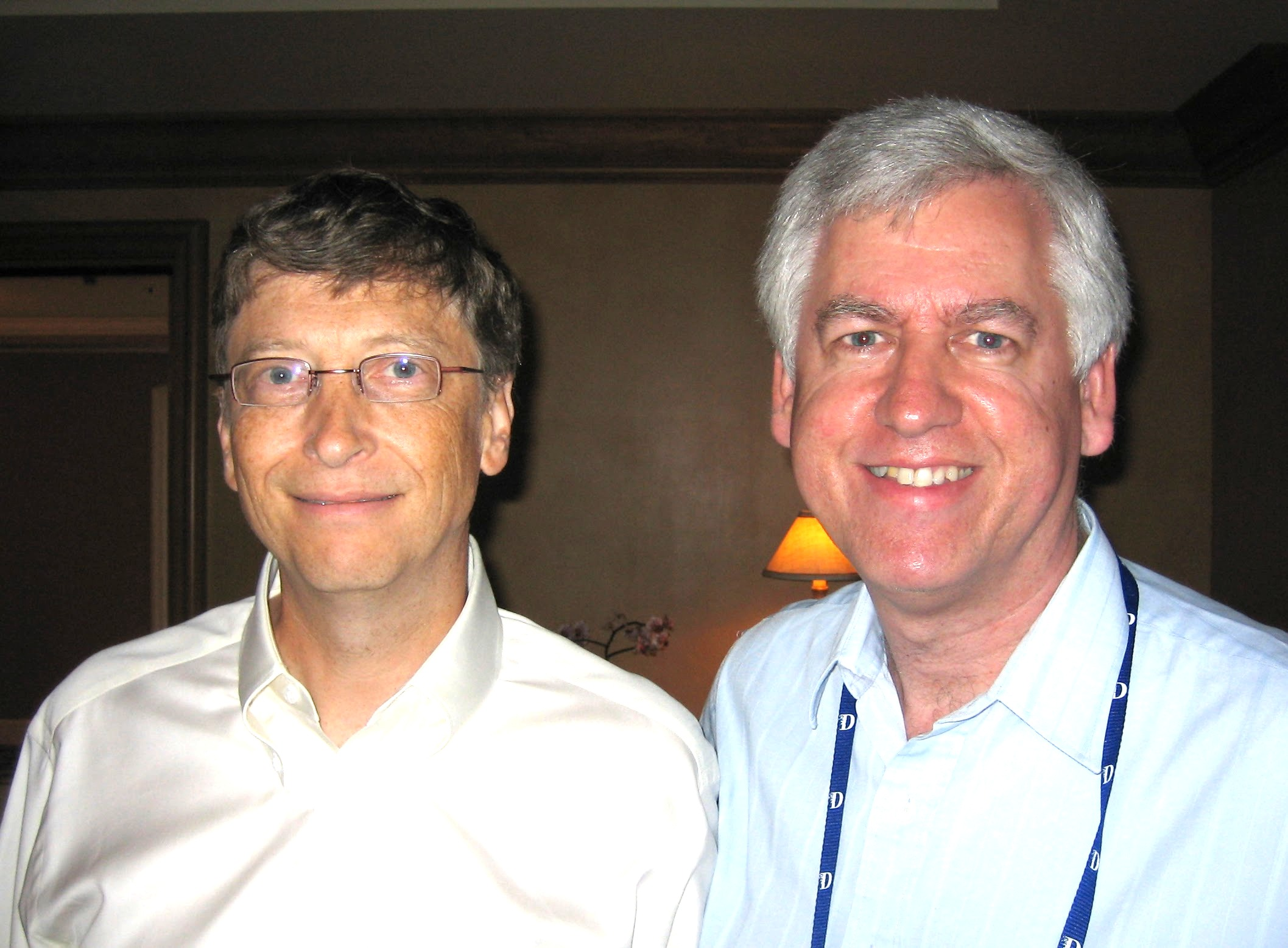
With Bill Gates, who inspired founding the company

In 1999, Rosenschein co-founded GuruNet, which evolved into Answers.com, with Morton Meyerson and Mark Tebbe, based on a product idea originally suggested by Yossi Vardi.

The original GuruNet product pioneered a one-click pop-up encyclopedia. The company later changed it name and flagship product to Answers.com. It then expanded to include WikiAnswers, a user-generated Q&A service described as “Wikipedia for questions and answers.” At its peak, Answers.com was the 20th most visited website in the United States, according to Comscore.

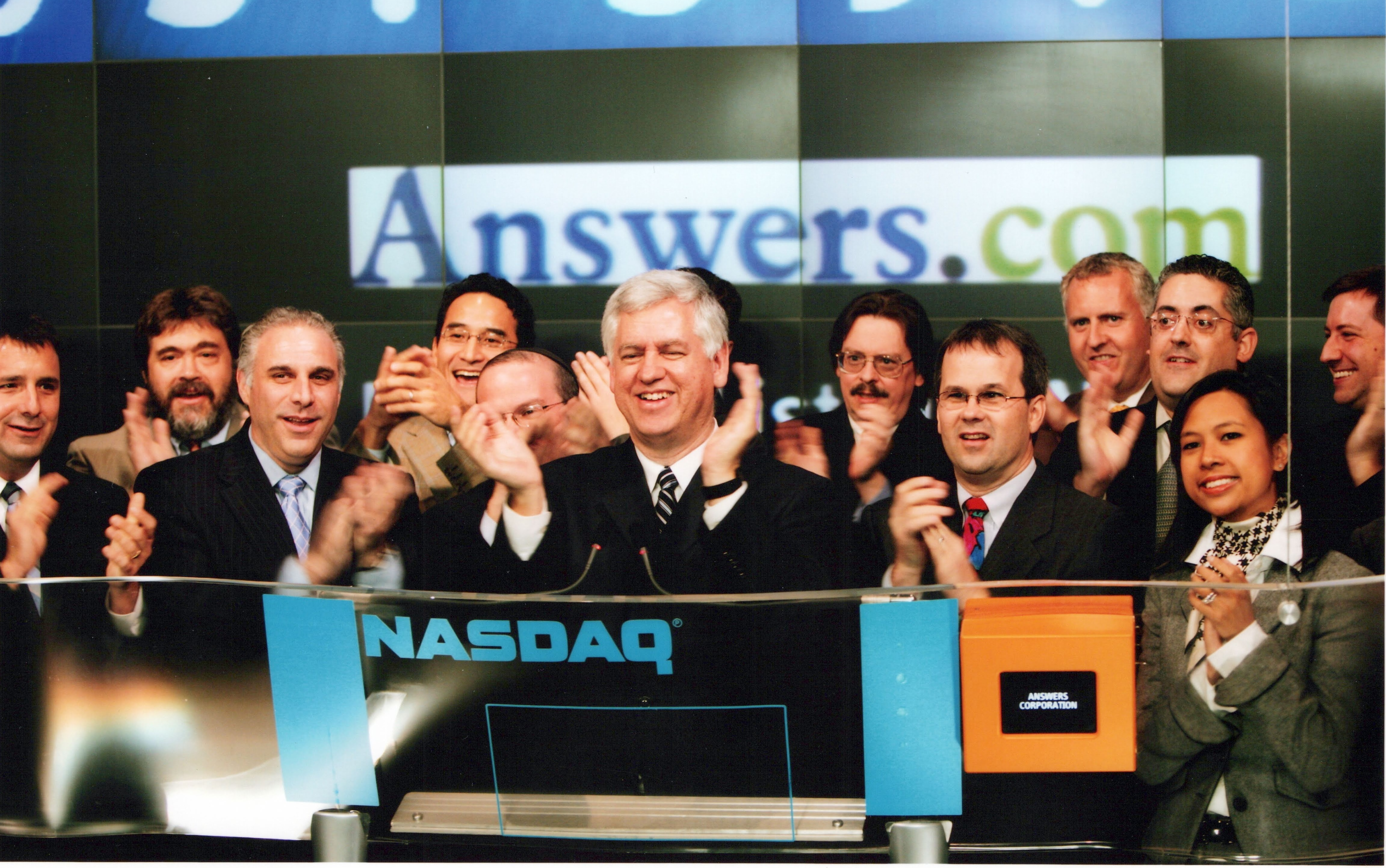
Ringing the bell at NASDAQ

Under Rosenschein's leadership, Answers.com was listed on NASDAQ and grew rapidly, helped in part by a significant traffic boost from a collaboration with Google. Marissa Mayer, then chief product manager at Google, approved Answers.com to appear as a reference link on Google's English-language search result pages. This relationship was active for five years and helped cement the platform's visibility.

=== Curiyo ===
After Answers.com was sold in 2011, Rosenschein founded Curiyo in 2012, a one-click contextual information tool designed to deliver definitions and background data inline without disrupting browsing. Curiyo partnered with USA Today and garnered media attention in several publications including TechCrunch, PCMag, and the Wall Street Journal.

== Personal life ==
Rosenschein resides in Jerusalem with his wife, Diane. He is the father of four sons and also a grandfather. He took a sabbatical from entrepreneurship following a heart attack in 2013, which he discusses in a blog on his Substack and Medium publications.
