= Oren Etzioni =

American computer scientist (born 1964)

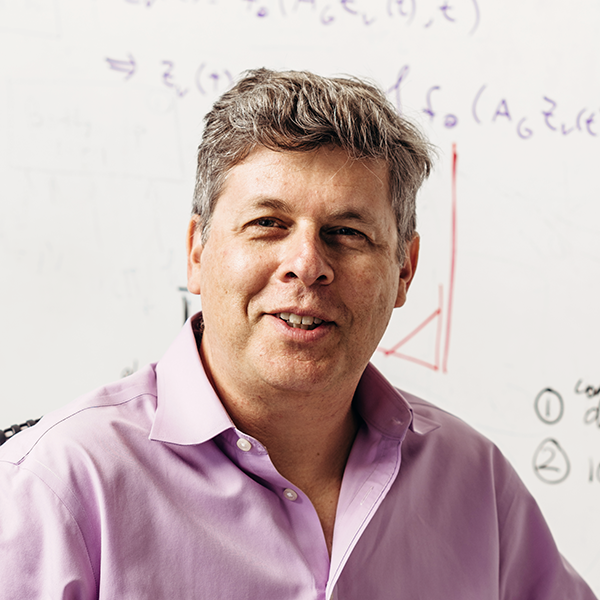
- Born: 1964 (age 61–62); New York, New York, U.S.
- Education: Harvard University (BA 1986); Carnegie Mellon University (PhD 1991)
- Relatives: Amitai Etzioni (father)
- Awards: AAAI Fellow (2003)
- Scientific career
- Fields: Computer science
- Workplaces: Allen Institute for Artificial Intelligence; University of Washington
- Doctoral advisor: Tom M. Mitchell

Oren Etzioni (born 1964) is Professor Emeritus of Computer Science at the University of Washington and founding CEO of the Allen Institute for Artificial Intelligence (AI2). Etzioni co-founded Vercept, an AI startup acquired by Anthropic in February 2026. He also founded and led TrueMedia.org, a nonprofit that operated an online service for detecting political deepfakes; in January 2025, the organization announced that it would shut down the service and release its technology as open source. He is also the Founder and Technical Director of the AI2 Incubator and a venture partner at the Madrona Venture Group.

== Early life and education ==
Etzioni is the son of Israeli-American intellectual Amitai Etzioni. He was the first student to major in computer science at Harvard University, where he earned a bachelor's degree in 1986. He earned a PhD from Carnegie Mellon University in January 1991, supervised by Tom M. Mitchell.

== Academic career ==
Etzioni joined the University of Washington faculty in 1991, immediately after receiving his PhD. He eventually became the Washington Research Foundation Entrepreneurship Professor in Computer Science & Engineering.

Etzioni's research has focused on basic problems in the study of intelligence, machine reading, machine learning and web search. Past projects include Internet Softbots, the study of intelligent agents in the context of real-world software testbeds. In 2003, he started the KnowItAll project for acquiring massive amounts of information from the web.

In 2005, he founded and became the director of the university's Turing Center. The center investigated problems in data mining, natural language processing, the Semantic Web and other web search topics. Etzioni coined the term machine reading and helped to create the first commercial comparison shopping agent. He has published over 200 technical papers, and his H-index exceeds 100.

== Entrepreneurship ==
As a faculty member at the University of Washington, Etzioni founded multiple companies, including MetaCrawler (bought by Infospace), Netbot (bought by Excite in 1997 for $35 million), and ClearForest (bought by Reuters). He founded Farecast, a travel metasearch and price prediction site, which was acquired by Microsoft in 2008 for $115 million. Before founding Farecast, he developed a program (originally called Hamlet) that used algorithms to identify patterns in airfare data using data-mining techniques.

He also co-founded Decide.com, a website to help consumers make buying decisions using previous price history and recommendations from other users. Decide.com was bought by eBay in September 2013. Etzioni is also a venture partner at the Madrona Venture Group.

Etzioni founded and led TrueMedia.org, a nonprofit that operated an online service for detecting political deepfakes; in January 2025, it announced that it would shut down the service and release its technology as open source.

He co-founded Vercept, an AI startup acquired by Anthropic in February 2026.

== Founding CEO of AI2 ==
In September 2013 Etzioni was selected as the Founding CEO of the Allen Institute for Artificial Intelligence by philanthropist Paul G. Allen, and in January 2014 he took a leave of absence from the University of Washington to serve in that role.

Etzioni's technical contributions continued at AI2; for example, in 2015, he helped to create the Semantic Scholar search engine. Under Etzioni's leadership, AI2 grew from zero to over two hundred team members including notable researchers and engineers across several domains of AI. By 2021, its AI2 researchers had published near 700 papers in publications such as AAAI, ACL, CVPR, NeurIPS, and ICLR. Twenty-four of these papers had garnered special-recognition awards. AI2 also offered several key resources and tools to the AI community including the AllenNLP library, Semantic Scholar, and the conservation platforms EarthRanger and Skylight.

Ed Lazowska, AI2 Board Member, has stated about Etzioni that he "took the collegial, collaborative culture that he absorbed in his 20+ years as a professor in UW's Allen School and mixed it with the singular focus that drives startups to create an elixir that AI2 folks have been drinking over the last eight years. The result is an exceptional organization of scientists, engineers, and entrepreneurs that's pursuing Paul Allen's vision of 'AI for the Common Good' with extraordinary success."

== Popular press ==
In addition to his scientific publications, Etzioni has written commentary on AI for The New York Times, Wired, Nature, and other publications.

After reading the idea in a book about AI by Brad Smith and Harry Shum, Etzioni has attempted to create an oath for AI practitioners. In 2018, he published what he called a "Hippocratic Oath for artificial intelligence practitioners" in TechCrunch.

== Awards and recognition ==
- In 1993, Etzioni received a National Young Investigator Award.
- In 2003, Etzioni was elected as AAAI Fellow.
- In 2005, Etzioni received an IJCAI Distinguished Paper Award for "A Probabilistic Model of Redundancy in Information Extraction".
- In 2007, he received the Robert S. Engelmore Memorial Award.
- In 2012 Etzioni was featured as GeekWire's "Geek of the Week".
- In 2013 Etzioni was voted "Geek of the Year" through GeekWire.
- In 2022, Etzioni received the 2012 ACL Test-of-Time Paper Award.
- In 2022, Etzioni, along with Ana-Maria Popescu and Henry Kautz, received the ACM Intelligent User Interfaces Most Impact Award for their 2003 paper, "Towards a Theory of Natural Language Interfaces to Databases".

== Personal life ==
Etzioni has three children. He is married to Ivone Etzioni, and was previously married to Dr. Ruth Etzioni, a biostatistician at the Fred Hutchinson Cancer Center.

Etzioni has attended the Burning Man festival, which he described as a valuable way to step outside his comfort zone.

His first computer was a TRS-80, and he has described his car's GPS as his favorite gadget, joking that he has "no sense of direction."

== Selected publications ==
=== Scholarly publications ===
- Etzioni, Oren (July 1994). "A Softbot-based Interface to the Internet" (PDF). Communications of the ACM.
- Etzioni, Oren (December 2008). "Open Information Extraction from the Web" (PDF). Communications of the ACM.
- Zamir, Oren; Etzioni, Oren (1998). "Web document clustering". Proceedings of the 21st annual international ACM SIGIR conference on Research and development in information retrieval. ACM. pp. 46–54. doi:10.1145/290941.290956. ISBN 978-1-58113-015-7. S2CID 244069.
- Zamir, Oren; Etzioni, Oren (May 1999). "Grouper: a dynamic clustering interface to Web search results". Computer Networks. 31 (11–16): 1361–1374. doi:10.1016/S1389-1286(99)00054-7. S2CID 206134308.
- Popescu, Ana-Maria; Etzioni, Oren (2005). "Extracting product features and opinions from reviews". Proceedings of the conference on Human Language Technology and Empirical Methods in Natural Language Processing - HLT '05. pp. 339–346. doi:10.3115/1220575.1220618.
- Etzioni, Oren; Cafarella, Michael; Downey, Doug; Popescu, Ana-Maria; Shaked, Tal; Sonderland, Stephen; Weld, Daniel; Yates, Alexander (June 2005). "Unsupervised named-entity extraction from the Web: An experimental study". Artificial Intelligence. 165 (1): 91–134. doi:10.1016/j.artint.2005.03.001.
- Downey, Doug; Etzioni, Oren; Sonderland, Stephen (July 2010). "Grouper: Analysis of a probabilistic model of redundancy in unsupervised information extraction". Artificial Intelligence. 174 (11): 726–748. doi:10.1016/j.artint.2010.04.024.

=== Popular articles ===
- Etzioni, Oren (August 4, 2011). "Web Search Needs a Shakeup" (PDF). Nature.
- Etzioni, Oren (December 9, 2014). "AI Won't Exterminate Us – It Will Empower Us". Backchannel.
- Etzioni, Oren (February 4, 2016). "To Keep AI Safe -- Use AI". Vox.
- Etzioni, Oren (April 8, 2016). "Quora Session with Oren Etzioni". Quora.
- Etzioni, Oren (June 15, 2016). "Deep Learning Isn't a Dangerous Magic Genie. It's Just Math". Wired.
- Etzioni, Oren (September 20, 2016). "No, the Experts Don't Think Superintelligent AI is a Threat to Humanity". MIT Technology Review.
- Etzioni, Oren (July 6, 2017). "Artificial intelligence: AI Zooms in on highly influential citations". Nature.
- Etzioni, Oren (September 1, 2017). "How to Regulate Artificial Intelligence". The New York Times.
- Etzioni, Oren (November 2, 2017). "Workers Displaced by Automation Should Try A New Job: Caregiver". Wired.
- Etzioni, Oren (March 14, 2018). "A Hippocratic Oath for artificial intelligence practitioners". Tech Crunch.
- Etzioni, Oren (March 7, 2018). "A 'Manhattan Project' for science research". The Hill.
- Etzioni, Oren (December 2018). "Point: Should AI Technology Be Regulated?: Yes, and Here's How". CACM.
- Etzioni, Oren (February 13, 2019). "What Trump's Executive Order on AI Is Missing". Wired.
- Etzioni, Oren (March 1, 2019). "How Will We Prevent AI-Based Forgery?". Harvard Business Review.
- Etzioni, Oren (July 17, 2019). "We have the basis for an international AI treaty". The Hill.
- Etzioni, Oren (July 18, 2019). "High-Stakes AI Decisions Need to Be Automatically Audited". Wired.
- Etzioni, Oren (October 18, 2019). "Analysis: Seattle startup ecosystem poised for unprecedented acceleration of company creation". GeekWire.
- Etzioni, Oren (October 18, 2019). "AI Academy Under Siege". Inside HigherEd.
- Etzioni, Oren (February 25, 2020). "How to know if artificial intelligence is about to destroy civilization". MIT Technology Review.
- Etzioni, Oren (March 28, 2020). "AI Can Help Scientists Find a Covid-19 Vaccine". Wired.
