= Zoo.com =

Search engine for kids

- Website type: Search Engine
- Available in: English
- Owner: System1
- Website: http://www.zoo.com/
- Launched: November 14, 2006; 19 years ago
- Current status: Active

Zoo.com is a metasearch engine, which as of 2006, provided results from search engines and other sources, including Google, Yahoo! and Wikipedia. Also as of 2006, Zoo.com provided news content from ABC News, Fox News and Yahoo! News.

== History ==
InfoSpace launched Zoo.com on November 14, 2006, as a kid-friendly metasearch engine after InfoSpace, through conducting their own survey, claimed that kids who are more reliant on the internet are more likely to encounter material inappropriate for them.

Zoo.com competed with other kid-friendly search engines at the time such as Yahoo!'s Yahooligans, AOL's Study Buddy, Ask's Ask for Kids and KidsClick!. The metasearch engine used several methods to filter out adult content such as adult sites and adult phrases and did not show results for certain search queries, such as "sex".

In 2014, MetaCrawler, another metasearch engine owned by InfoSpace, was merged into Zoo.com, but was later relaunched as its own search engine in 2017.

In July 2016, Blucora announced the sale of its InfoSpace business to OpenMail for $45 million, putting Zoo.com under the ownership of OpenMail. OpenMail was later renamed System1.
