= Bustripping =

Meta-search engine for intercity buses

Bustripping was a meta-search engine for intercity buses in the U.S. It allowed travelers to compare bus companies when looking for direct line run and private charter services.

== Founders ==
It was founded in 2011 by Ben Silverstein. He earned a degree in Business Administration and Marketing from the College of Charleston.

== Product ==
Bustripping acted as a search engine for intercity buses in the US. Users entered departing and arriving cities, and dates of travel (roundtrip or one way) and bustripping showed all the bus companies that travel that route side-by-side. Bustripping partnered directly with bus companies or their affiliates, pulling the data in real time, then sorting and categorizing all information.

The website launched to the public on May 22, 2013.

== History ==
A beta version of bustripping launched in 2012. Silverstein then attempted a failed Indiegogo project to raise money to build a better version of the site.
