= Justfly.com =

Canadian online travel agency

- Founded: 2012; 14 years ago
- Headquarters: Montreal, Canada
- Area served: Global
- Products: Travel agency Metasearch engine
- Website: www.justfly.com

Justfly.com (JustFly Inc) is a Canadian online travel agency and metasearch engine. It is a subsidiary of FlightHub Group.

== History ==
Justfly.com is a Canadian company and subsidiary of FlightHub Group. The company was founded in 2012 in Montreal and justfly.com was created in 2014 to offer international and domestic travel options to American consumers.

In 2019, it had 5 million customers.

In November 2018, Competition Bureau Canada began an investigation into the company's misleading marketing practices, culminating in a $5 million penalty for the company as well as $0.8 million of penalties for its directors. In September 2019, Dennis Herrera, the city attorney of San Francisco sued the company over hidden fees and other predatory scams.

In 2020, to deal with a decline in travel during the COVID-19 pandemic, the company filed bankruptcy under Chapter 15, Title 11, United States Code and underwent a court-supervised restructuring process under the Companies' Creditors Arrangement Act, which was completed in May 2021.

In 2022, FlightHub Group re-opened its head office in Montreal and re-expanded its operations to meet the surge in customer demand for post-COVID-19 pandemic travel services.
