= Blufr =

- blufr logo
- Developer: blufr.com
- Publisher: blufr.com
- Platform: Web browser
- Release: WW: July 2, 2006
- Genre: Trivia
- Modes: Single-player, multiplayer

Blufr was an online trivia game launched on July 2, 2006. It was later made defunct.

== Gameplay ==
Players had to decide if statements – called blufs – are true ('way') or false ('no way'). After they chose their answer the correct answer was then displayed, along with links to relevant topics in Answers.com, the creator of the game. Players can keep score and see how they fare against other top contenders in the game. Players were able to challenge their friends by sending blufs by email or adding them as content to their own personal websites and blogs.

== Development ==
Answers.com launched blufr as an alternative way to learn about the millions of topics it covers, using an entertaining style, as opposed to traditional reference look-up techniques. It was shut down by Answers.com in September 2007. In July 2010, the blufr homepage featured a teaser for what is likely to be the reincarnation of the game. The homepage features a new logo with the text, "Coming soon... whether you like it or not." In mid-August 2010, blufr was silently released as a beta version. There are plans by Answers.com to release an iPhone version and Facebook app in September 2010. On October 5, 2010, Answers.com issues a press release announcing the official launch of the blufr website and iPhone app. It was also stated that a Facebook version is following shortly.
