= HowStuffWorks =

American commercial infotainment website

HowStuffWorks, Inc.
- Website type: Educational website
- Available in: English
- Headquarters: Atlanta, Georgia, {{{location_country}}}
- Country of origin: United States
- Owners: iHeartMedia; System1
- Creator: Marshall Brain
- Website: www.howstuffworks.com
- Commercial: Yes
- Registration: None
- Launched: July 11, 1998; 28 years ago
- Current status: Active

HowStuffWorks is an American commercial infotainment website founded by professor and author Marshall Brain, to provide its target audience an insight into the way many things work. The site uses various media to explain complex concepts, terminology, and mechanisms—including photographs, diagrams, videos, animations, and articles.

The website was acquired by Discovery Communications in 2007, but was sold to Blucora in 2014. The site has since expanded out into podcasting, focusing on factual topics. In December 2016, HowStuffWorks, LLC became a subsidiary of OpenMail, LLC, later renamed System1. In 2018, the podcast division of the company, which had been spun-off by System1 under the name Stuff Media, was acquired by iHeartMedia for $55 million.

== History ==
In 1998, then North Carolina State University instructor Marshall Brain (1961–2024), started the site as a hobby. In 1999, Brain raised venture capital and formed HowStuffWorks, Inc. In March 2002, HowStuffWorks was sold to the Convex Group, an Atlanta-based investment and media company founded by Jeff Arnold, founder and former chief executive officer (CEO) of WebMD. The headquarters moved from Cary, North Carolina, to Atlanta. HowStuffWorks originally focused on science and machines, ranging from submarines to common household gadgets and appliances. After adding a staff of writers, artists, and editors, content expanded to a larger array of topics.

On October 20, 2004, Stuffo.com was created, and HowStuffWorks moved its entertainment section over to the new website. In 2005, the team disbanded Stuffo.

The domain HowStuffWorks.com attracted at least 58 million visitors annually by 2008, according to a Compete.com survey.

There have been four HowStuffWorks books—two illustrated hardcover coffee table books, HowStuffWorks and More HowStuffWorks, and two un-illustrated paperbacks, How Much Does the Earth Weigh? and What If?. HowStuffWorks previously put out an educational magazine, HowStuffWorks Express, for middle-school students. The company has also released a series of HowStuffWorks trivia "LidRock" discs—CD-ROMs sold on fountain drink lids at Regal Theaters.

In 2005, HowStuffWorks became the exclusive online publisher for Publications International, Ltd., Consumer Guide and Mobil Travel Guide.

Howstuffworks.com spun off its international division when it went public (Nasdaq:HSWI) via an acquisition of INTAC, a China-based company. In March 2007, HSW International launched its Portuguese website with headquarters in São Paulo, Brazil. The Portuguese name of the site is Como Tudo Funciona ("how everything works"). In June 2008, the Chinese site was launched with new headquarters in Beijing, China. The URL roughly translates to "Knowledge Information Web".

On October 15, 2007, Discovery Communications announced it had bought HowStuffWorks for $250 million. The company later chose to use the name HowStuffWorks as the title of a television series on its Discovery Channel. The series, which focuses on commodities, premiered in November 2008 and is similar in style and content to other "how it works" programs, like Modern Marvels.

On November 2, 2009, HSW International co-founded Sharecare, developing a social QA platform through which users ask health and wellness-related questions, receiving answers from industry experts. Other co-founders in Sharecare include Jeff Arnold, Dr. Mehmet Oz, Harpo Productions, Discovery Communications, and Sony Pictures Television.

On April 21, 2014, Discovery Communications announced that it had sold HowStuffWorks to Blucora for $45 million. In July 2016, Blucora announced the sale of its Infospace business, including HowStuffWorks, to OpenMail for $45 million. OpenMail was later renamed System1.

In 2014, HowStuffWorks moved its headquarters from Buckhead to Ponce City Market, a new mixed-use development in the Old Fourth Ward neighborhood of Atlanta. In June 2017, it announced the hiring of Cracked.com founder and former editor-in-chief Jack O'Brien for its new comedy podcasting division.

In 2017, System1 spun off the podcast department of HowStuffWorks as Stuff Media, retaining the HowStuffWorks website. In September 2018, Stuff Media announced its sale to radio broadcaster iHeartMedia for $55 million.

== Podcasts ==
HowStuffWorks maintained a large number of podcasts, hosted by its staff writers and editors, but now all former HSW podcasts are owned and operated by iHeartRadio.

- Stuff You Should Know: an audio podcast and video series on various topics from all fields of interest
- TechStuff: dedicated to demystifying technology and discussing its impact on society, originally hosted by technology editor Chris Pollette and senior staff writer Jonathan Strickland. In January 2013, Chris Pollette was replaced as co-host by Social Media Editor Lauren Vogelbaum. Vogelbaum left the program in 2015 and Strickland became a solo host.
- Atlanta Monster: in cooperation with Tenderfoot TV, a crime podcast about the Atlanta murders of 1979–81, hosted by Payne Lindsey of podcast Up and Vanished
- Behind the Bastards: is a weekly comedic history podcast hosted by Robert Evans exploring the lives of deplorable historical figures.

== See also ==
- eHow
- How It's Made
- The Way Things Work
- wikiHow
