= Joe Kraus =

American entrepreneur

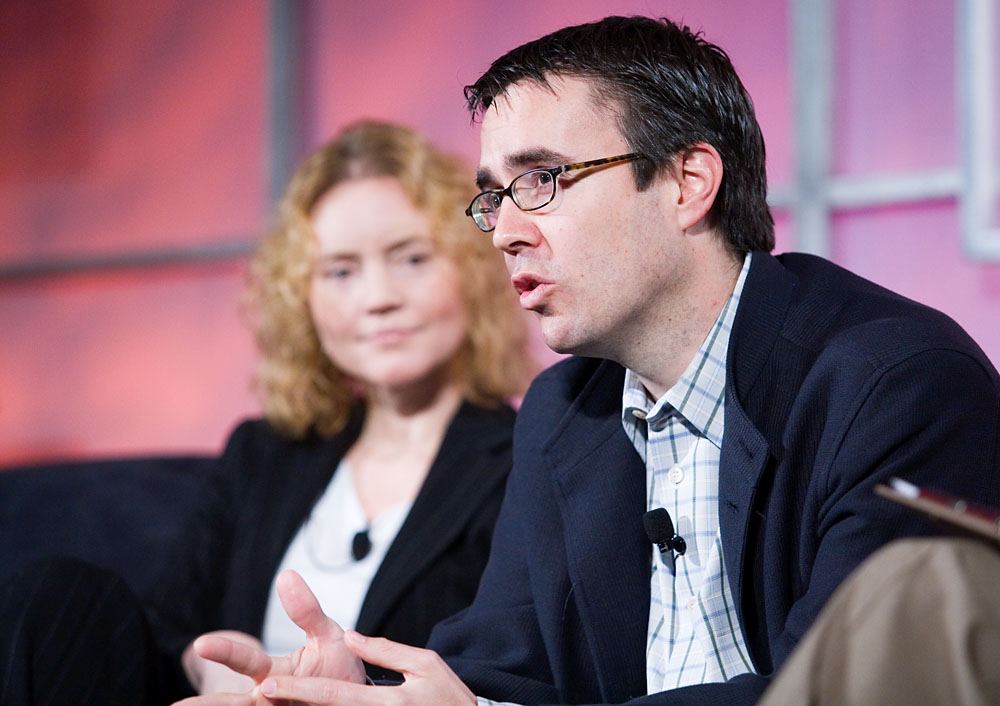
Joe Kraus in 2005

Joe Kraus is the founder of Excite, JotSpot, and DigitalConsumer.org, along with his long-time business partner Graham Spencer. Currently, Kraus is an Investment Partner on the GV team and President at Lime.

== Career ==
A long time entrepreneur, Kraus has been involved with early-stage technology development and starting companies for more than twelve years. Upon graduation from Stanford University in 1993 with a bachelor's degree in political science, he joined with five engineering friends to found the Internet company Excite, which would declare bankruptcy in 2001 . As the original President of Excite, Kraus was involved in product strategy, direction and vision as the company grew. He also held senior operational roles in business development, international development and content.

After leaving Excite@Home in 2000, Kraus was a co-founder of Digitalconsumer.org, a non-profit consumer organization with more than 50,000 members dedicated to expanding consumers' fair-use rights to digital media. Kraus, along with other co-founder Graham Spencer, continued to work on these issues. In 2006, Kraus joined the board of the Electronic Frontier Foundation. In addition to his non-profit focus, he has also spent many years as an angel investor, working with numerous early-stage technology companies.

Kraus was CEO of JotSpot, which was purchased by Google in 2006. While at Google, Kraus was a Director of Product Management. One of his projects was OpenSocial, Google's effort to develop API standards for social networking platforms. In 2009, he became a partner at Google Ventures.

Kraus helped to lead the investment for GV in OpenCandy and is on their board of directors.

In November 2018, it was announced that Joe Kraus would become Lime’s first COO.
