= Farecast =

Airfare prediction website in the computer reservations system industry

- Website type: Airfare prediction website
- Owners: Farecast Inc.; acquired by Microsoft in 2008
- Website: farecast.com (archived)
- Commercial: Yes
- Launched: May 15, 2007
- Current status: Defunct; Bing Travel still exists as of 2025 but without airfare predictions

Farecast (acquired by Microsoft and rebranded Live Search Farecast in 2008, then Bing Travel in 2009, and finally MSN Travel in 2015, when its underlying technology had been discontinued) was an airfare prediction website in the computer reservations system industry. It launched in beta in 2006 and premiered to the public on May 15, 2007. Until 2014, it offered predictions regarding the best time to purchase airline tickets.

== History ==
Farecast was founded in 2003; Farecast's team of data miners used airfare observations to build algorithms to predict future airfare price movements. Founded by Oren Etzioni, it launched in beta in 2006 and premiered to the public on May 15, 2007.

In April 2008, Farecast was acquired by Microsoft for $115 million. Microsoft officially integrated it as part of its Live Search group of tools in May 2008.

On June 3, 2009, Microsoft officially rebranded "Live Search Farecast" as "Bing Travel" as part of its efforts to create a new search identity with Bing. In 2009, there were allegations that Bing Travel had copied its layouts from Kayak; Microsoft denied the allegations. In January 2014, the airfare prediction feature, which was previously the flagship feature of Farecast, was removed from Bing Travel.

In May 2015, Microsoft rebranded "Bing Travel" to "MSN Travel" and, for some time, redirected the Bing Travel website to MSN Travel. In August 2015, however, Microsoft shut down its MSN Travel app, and the MSN Travel flight search pages changed from being powered by Kayak to competitor Skyscanner. Microsoft later shut down the MSN Travel website entirely, but as of 2025, Bing retains a Bing Travel search section on its website.
