= Associative browsing =

Associative browsing is the professional name for several methods of browsing the web. These methods are usually assisted by some sort of a discovery tool and are considered to be more intuitive.

The tools that serve the associative browsing are similarity/relevancy tools. They use different algorithms to analyze the content and the user in order to offer him or direct him to the next link in what is considered his associative chain. One of the more familiar sites to use the associative browsing method was Pandora.com, the site used a relevancy engine to bring users music they would like according to the music they are listening right now. The site's algorithm tried to forecast the next link (in this case a song) in the user's associative chain.

Associative browsing can be done without the discovery tools but due to the internet overload of information this can be done on a very thin surface line. For example, when you are looking at shoes on the Nike website you can type Puma.com and continue surfing associatively, but your intuitive recalling of shoes websites is limited and at some point you will be forced to perform a search.

The difference between searching and associative browsing is in the "flow" of the events. While in associative browsing you are surfing from site to site following your associative chain, in search mode you are inquiring information which will help you develops an associative chain.

The implementation of associative browsing can be on different levels and on different subjects. The discovery tools can try to guess the next link in one's associative chain, the next song one will hear, the next site one will visit or the next product one will shop for.

== See also ==
- Metabrowsing
- Recommender system
- Webring
