= Quickbrowse =

Quickbrowse.com, Inc.
- Type: Private
- Industry: Internet
- Founded: December 14, 1998; 27 years ago
- Headquarters: Miami Beach, Florida, U.S.
- Key people: Marc Fest, Founder and CEO
- Products: metabrowsing
- Website: www.quickbrowse.com

Quickbrowse was a Web-based subscription service that enables users to browse multiple Web pages more quickly by combining them vertically into a single Web page. It was one of the early metabrowsing services.

== History ==
Quickbrowse received wide media coverage during the height of the Dot-com bubble. It was quickly followed by other metabrowsers such as Octopus.com (backed by Netscape founder Marc Andreessen), Onepage.com (backed by Microsoft co-founder Paul Allen), iHarvest.com, Katiesoft.com and Calltheshots.com - all of which have ceased to operate as metabrowsers. Octopus received more than $11.4 million in venture capital funding from Redpoint Ventures. Onepage received $25 million in venture capital funding. Quickbrowse received half a million dollars in angel funding. Quickbrowse backers included its lead investor, Geocities.com founder David Bohnett, the financial writer Andrew Tobias and CBS hurricane expert Bryan Norcross. From 2001 to 2004, the Miami Herald licensed Quickbrowse and operated myHerald.com, a service that was based on the Quickbrowse approach of customizable Web content. Quickbrowse ceased operation in 2005.

Quickbrowse was created by Marc Fest, a former journalist and self-taught programmer who initially created it as a tool to facilitate his daily journalist research.
