= Answers.com =

Q&A site founded in 1999

Answers Corporation
- "The Most Trusted Place for Answering Life's Questions"
- Company type: Subsidiary
- Website type: Question & Answer
- Available in: 6 languages
- Founded: 1999; 27 years ago (as GuruNet)
- Headquarters: St. Louis, Missouri, United States
- Area served: Worldwide
- Founders: Bob Rosenschein; Mark Tebbe
- Key people: Curtis Strite (GM & CTO); Ben McCoy (CFO)
- Industry: Internet
- Employees: 18
- Parent: System1
- Website: answers.com
- Launched: January 2005; 21 years ago
- Current status: Active

Answers
- Operating system: iOS, Android
- Website: iOS Android

Answers.com (previously WikiAnswers and originally GuruNet) is an Internet-based knowledge exchange. The Answers.com domain name was purchased by Bill Gross and Henrik Jones at idealab in 1996. The domain name was acquired by NetShepard and subsequently sold to GuruNet and then AFCV Holdings. The website is now the primary product of the Answers Corporation. It has tens of millions of user-generated questions and answers, and provides a website where registered users can interact with one another.

== History ==
GuruNet was founded in Jerusalem during 1999 to develop technology that integrates or retrieves information from disparate sources and delivers the result in a single consolidated view to the user. GuruNet initially displayed its information through a downloadable software product, today known as 1-Click Answers. The product was launched as a free product in 1999. Beginning in 2003 it was sold to users on a perpetual license base and later as an annual subscription.

In October 2004, GuruNet had an IPO on the American Stock Exchange (AMEX) under the symbol "GRU" and also acquired the Answers.com domain name early the same year for $80,000.

In January 2005, the company began a new business model of free-to-customer product. Answers.com and 1-Click Answers software, containing practically all the content that was sold via subscriptions. The new model was based on generating advertising revenue.

On August 2, 2005, the company's shares started trading on NASDAQ instead of AMEX under the symbol "ANSW".

On October 17, 2005, GuruNet changed its corporate name to Answers Corporation, unifying the company's name and its website, Answers.com.

From 2005 to late 2009, the Google search engine definitions feature, in the top-right corner of the site, was linked to Answers.com.

On July 2, 2006, Answers.com released a trivia game known as blufr.

In November 2006, Answers.com acquired the question and answer site FAQ Farm. Following the acquisition, the product was renamed WikiAnswers.

In the fall of 2009, Answers.com launched a revamped version of their website that fully integrated WikiAnswers.

At Jeff Pulver's 140 Characters Conference in New York City in April 2010, Answers.com launched its alpha version of a Twitter-answering service nicknamed 'Hoopoe.' When tweeting a question to the site's official Twitter account, @AnswersDotCom, an automatic reply is given with a snippet of the answer and a link to the full answer page on Answers.com.

Aside from providing community-generated Q&A and reference information for published titles, Answers.com began offering videos as part of its VideoAnswers library, in July 2010. This was part of a partnership with video site 5min.

In September 2010, blufr was relaunched as an iPhone/iPod Touch app with new design, game modes, and social features.

It was announced in November 2010 that the Answers.com Q&A community reached its 10 millionth answer.

At the start of 2011, the site surpassed 11 million answers. Shortly after, on February 3, Answers.com announced in a press release that it had agreed to be acquired by AFCV Holdings for $127 million in cash. AFCV Holdings, LLC, is a portfolio company of growth equity investor Summit Partners. Bob Rosenschein was quoted: "The acquisition price of $10.50 per share represents a significant cash premium of approximately 33% over our 90-day volume-weighted average closing stock price."

On April 23, 2012, TA Associates announced that it was joining as an additional private investor in Answers.com and on May 1, 2012, laid off the remaining development staff in the Jerusalem office as a first step in fully assimilating the company.

On August 8, 2012, reports surfaced that Answers.com had reached a preliminary agreement to acquire About.com from The New York Times Company for $270 million of debt and equity. However, it was thwarted by IAC, who countered with a $300 million "clean cash" offer.

On December 23, 2013, Answers.com acquired ForeSee Results, Inc., a customer experience & customer survey analytics company based in Ann Arbor, Michigan, USA. Answers.com proceeded to lay off between 50 and 75 employees one month after the acquisition, followed by another 100 layoffs 18 months later.

In August 2014, Apax Partners acquired Answers Corp. for $900 million. The terms of the deal were that Apax would own 91% of the company while Answers’ founders and management team will own the remaining 9% stake.

In March 2017, Answers.com parent company, Answers Corp, filed for Chapter 11 bankruptcy.

In May 2018, the website underwent a makeover, with the entire user database purged and users no longer able to edit questions or answers; the website was kept readable in a static state. In October 2019, it was re-launched with redesigned user-generated content functionality, enabling new user registrations, questions, multiple answers, reactions, and comments.

In September 2020, Answers.com launched native iOS and Android apps focused on Homework Help Q&A.

In May 2022, Answers.com was purchased by System1.

== See also ==
- Stack Exchange
- Quora
- Yahoo Answers
