= WebCrawler =

Web search engine

- Logo since 2018
- Website type: Search engine
- Available in: English
- Owner: System1
- Creator: Brian Pinkerton
- Website: www.webcrawler.com
- Commercial: No
- Registration: None
- Launched: April 20, 1994; 32 years ago
- Current status: Active

WebCrawler is a search engine, and one of the oldest surviving search engines on the web today. For many years, it operated as a metasearch engine. WebCrawler was the first web search engine to provide full-text search.

== History ==
Screenshot of WebCrawler homepage in September 1995

Brian Pinkerton first started working on WebCrawler, which was originally a desktop application, on January 27, 1994 at the University of Washington. On March 15, 1994, he generated a list of the top 25 websites.

WebCrawler launched on April 21, 1994, with more than 4,000 different websites in its database and on November 14, 1994, WebCrawler served its 1 millionth search query for "nuclear weapons design and research".

On December 1, 1994, WebCrawler acquired two sponsors, DealerNet and Starwave, which provided money to keep WebCrawler operating. Starting on October 3, 1995, WebCrawler was fully supported by advertising, but separated the adverts from search results.

On June 1, 1995, America Online (AOL) acquired WebCrawler. After being acquired by AOL, the website introduced its mascot "Spidey" on September 1, 1995.

Starting in April 1996, WebCrawler also included the human-edited internet guide GNN Select, which was also under AOL ownership.

On April 1, 1997, Excite acquired WebCrawler from AOL for $12.3 million.

WebCrawler received a redesign on June 16, 1997, adding WebCrawler Shortcuts, which suggested alternative links to material related to a search topic.

WebCrawler was maintained by Excite as a separate search engine with its own database until 2001, when it started using Excite's own database, effectively putting an end to WebCrawler as an independent search engine. Later that year, Excite (then called Excite@Home) went bankrupt and WebCrawler was bought by InfoSpace in 2001.

WebCrawler's homepage (June 2010)

Pinkerton, WebCrawler's creator, led the Amazon A9.com search division as of 2012.

In July 2016, InfoSpace was sold by parent company Blucora to OpenMail for $45 million, putting WebCrawler under the ownership of OpenMail. OpenMail was later renamed System1.

In 2018, WebCrawler was redesigned from scratch and its logo was changed.

== Traffic ==
WebCrawler was highly successful early on. At one point, it was unusable during peak times due to server overload. It was the second most visited website on the internet in February 1996, but it quickly dropped below rival search engines and directories such as Yahoo!, Infoseek, Lycos, and Excite in 1997.

== See also ==
- Aliweb
- InfoSpace
- Dogpile
- MetaCrawler
- List of search engines
- Search engine
- Comparison of search engines
