= Dogpile =

Metasearch engine

- Dogpile's homepage featuring their mascot, Arfie (September 2012)
- Website type: Metasearch engine
- Available in: English
- Owner: System1
- Creator: Aaron Flin
- Website: www.dogpile.com
- Launched: November 1996; 29 years ago
- Current status: Active

Dogpile is a metasearch engine for information on the World Wide Web that fetches results from Google, Yahoo!, Yandex, Bing and other popular search engines, including those from audio and video content providers, such as Yahoo!.

== History ==
Dogpile began operation in November 1996. The site was created and developed by Aaron Flin, who was frustrated with the varying results of existing indexes and intending on making Dogpile query multiple indexes for the best search results. It originally provided web searches from Yahoo! (directory), Lycos (inc. A2Z directory), Excite (inc. Excite Guide directory), WebCrawler, Infoseek, AltaVista, HotBot, WhatUseek (directory), and World Wide Web Worm. It naturally drew comparisons with MetaCrawler, a multi-threaded search engine that had existed before, but Dogpile was more advanced, and it could also search Usenet (from sources including DejaNews) and FTP (via Filez and other indexes).

In August 1999, Dogpile was acquired by Go2net, who were already operating MetaCrawler. Go2net was then acquired by InfoSpace in July 2000 for $4 billion. Dogpile received a design facelift for the first time in December 2000.

The Dogpile search engine earned the J.D. Power and Associates award for best Residential Online Search Engine Service in both 2006 and 2007.

In August 2008, Dogpile and Petfinder agreed to a search partnership.

In November 2008, Dogpile launched its "Search and Rescue" program, which donates money to animal-related charities. The program also helps people find help for animals in need. By early-December 2008, people using the Dogpile search engine had raised $100,000 for Dogpile's Search and Rescue program.

In July 2016, InfoSpace was sold by its parent company Blucora to OpenMail for $45 million in cash, putting Dogpile under the ownership of OpenMail. OpenMail was later renamed System1.

== Studies ==
In April 2005, Dogpile collaborated with researchers from University of Pittsburgh and Pennsylvania State University to measure the overlap and ranking differences of leading Web search engines in order to gauge the benefits of using a metasearch engine to search the web. Results found that from 10,316 random user-defined queries from Google, Yahoo!, and Ask Jeeves only 3.2% of first page search results were the same across those search engines for a given query. Another study later that year using 12,570 random user-defined queries from Google, Yahoo!, MSN Search, and Ask Jeeves found that only 1.1% of first page search results were the same across those search engines for a given query.

These studies showed that each search engine provides vastly different results. While users of the search engine may not recognize a problem, it was shown that they use ~3 search engines per month. Dogpile realized that searchers are not necessarily finding the results they were looking for in one search engine and thus decided to redefine their existing metasearch engine to provide the best results.

== Features ==
As of 2013, Dogpile listed the following features in addition to its search function:

- Category Links: Links to help users focus their search on specific categories like News, Audio, etc.
- Yellow Pages: Allows users to do a search using the Yellow Pages for business, institutions and firms.
- White Pages: Allows users to do a search using the White Pages for private people. (No longer available as of February 23, 2017)
- Preferences: Links to a page where users can set a variety of customized search preferences.
- Spelling Correction: Offers suggested spellings for words that may be misspelled and automatically corrects commonly misspelled keywords.
- Search Filter: Blocks potentially explicit content for multimedia searches in Moderate setting and for all searches when in Heavy setting.
- Statistics Bar: Shows how many results were returned for the search term.
- About Results: Find out about Dogpile's policies regarding sponsored and non-sponsored search results.
- IntelliFind: Recommends additional content based on the original search term.
- Are You Looking For?: Offers suggested spellings for words that may be misspelled and other search keywords that seem to be related to the original search term.
- Recent Searches: Keeps track of the 15 most recent searches. The list resets when the browser is closed.
- Favorite Fetches: Shows recent popular searches from other users.

== See also ==
- InfoSpace
- List of search engines
- MetaCrawler
- Metasearch engine
- WebCrawler
