= Excite (web portal) =

Internet portal

- Website type: Metasearch engine with outsourced web portal components
- Available in: English
- Predecessor: Architext
- Owner: Ask Media Group
- Parent: People Incorporated
- Website: excite.com
- Commercial: Yes
- Registration: None
- Launched: October 1995; 31 years ago
- Current status: Shut down in August 2026; 3 months ago

Excite was a web portal providing a list of hyperlinks to other websites online from 1995 to 2026. Founded in 1993, Excite.com was once the world's sixth most visited website in 1997. It merged with @Home Network in 1999 and filed for bankruptcy in 2001, after the bursting of the dot-com bubble; the website went into a steep decline in popularity thereafter. Its services were acquired by iWon and then by Ask Jeeves, which was acquired by IAC Inc. Excite continued to be operated by Ask Media Group through the 2000s and 2010s, with search services were provided by System1. Excite.com was shut down in August 2026 following the shutdown of Ask.com. Excite Japan (エキサイト), however, continues to be operated by Excite Holdings, formed in 2018.

== History ==
=== Founding and release ===
The company was founded as Architext in June 1993 in Cupertino, California, by 6 university friends: Graham Spencer, Joe Kraus, Mark VanHaren, Ryan McIntyre, Ben Lutch and Martin Reinfried, who were all students at Stanford University. The idea for the company was first discussed in a burrito shop. Isabel Maxwell (the sister of Ghislaine Maxwell) was a co-founder of the company behind early search engine Magellan. Isabel joined twin sister Christine Maxwell who was leading a small company called Research on Demand that was online in 1993.

In July 1994, International Data Group paid them US$80,000 to develop an online service, and in January 1995, Vinod Khosla, a former Stanford student and partner at Kleiner Perkins, arranged a US$250,000 "first round" backing for the project, with US$1.5 million provided over a ten-month period. Soon thereafter, Geoff Yang, of Institutional Venture Partners, provided an additional US$1.5 million in financing. Excite was launched in October 1995. Jim Bellows was hired to figure out how to present the content in a journalistic manner.

Joe Kraus, co-founder of Excite.

=== Dot-com boom ===
In January 1996, George Bell joined Excite as its chief executive officer. In April, Excite became a public company via an initial public offering; Lycos and Yahoo also held IPOs that month, all on the Nasdaq. By June, the company had acquired the Magellan search engine for $18 million in stock and the assumption of debt. In November, Excite acquired WebCrawler from AOL and was named the exclusive search engine for AOL, in a deal that gave AOL a 20% stake in Excite.

In January 1997, the site was redesigned and members of the content crew were laid off. Meanwhile, in June 1997, the company agreed to sell tickets via Ticketmaster, and Intuit acquired 19% of the company for $40 million. Furthermore, in July, Excite began offering a free webmail service. By October, the company reached a deal to be featured in Microsoft's Internet Explorer web browser. At the same month, Excite also launched operations in Japan in partnership with Itochu.

In 1998, Excite became the search engine on the Netscape homepage in a 2-year deal worth $70 million in May. Excite launched online auctions in June, and expanded to Australia via an A$28 million joint venture with LibertyOne to launch services in Australia. In November 1998, Bank One received the exclusive rights to market banking services on the Excite home page in a partnership worth as much as $125 million. Excite received $8 million upfront.

In December 1998, Yahoo! was in negotiations to purchase Excite for $5.5 billion to $6 billion. Meanwhile, in 1999, Sergey Brin and Larry Page, then graduate students at Stanford University, decided that BackRub, the name of their research project that later became Google Search, was taking up time they should have been using to study. They offered it to Excite for $1 million, but Bell rejected the offer, and later threw Vinod Khosla out of his office after he had negotiated Brin and Page down to $750,000. CEO of Excite George Bell said that the deal fell apart because Larry Page wanted Excite's search technologies to be replaced by Google's, to which Bell did not agree. At that time, both Yahoo and Microsoft were interested in acquiring Excite.

=== Merger with @Home ===
In January 1999, Excite agreed to merge with @Home Network in a transaction valued at $6.7 billion in stock, forming "Excite@Home", with George Bell as CEO. At this time, Excite was the sixth largest Internet portal by traffic. AT&T, the largest shareholder of @Home Network, gained voting control of the combined company. In July 1999, the company acquired iMall for $425 million in stock and reached a marketing deal with First Data. In October 1999, Excite launched Work.com. Excite also acquired Webshots, an image sharing company, for $82.5 million in stock. However, in 2001, the founders bought back the company for $2.5 million.

In November 1999, it launched Excite StoreBuilder, a small-business hosting service. And in December 1999, Excite acquired Blue Mountain Arts, an e-card company, for $350 million in cash and 11 million shares of Excite stock. The e-card venture was sold to American Greetings for $35 million in September 2001. In January 2000, the company launched a free internet access service. That month, it partnered with Procter & Gamble to launch a site to market P&G products to teenagers.

In March 2000, Excite sponsored Infiniti IndyCar Series driver Eddie Cheever, Jr., for the 2000 and 2001 racing seasons in an estimated $3 million deal. Further into the spring, in May 2000, the company announced a web portal for mobile devices. However, in September 2000, after the company announced notable losses, CEO George Bell resigned. By April 2001, the company announced that it needed financing to continue operations. As an effect, Excite shut down the Magellan search engine in May.

=== Crisis and bankruptcy ===
In June 2001, Excite@Home raised $100 million in convertible note financing from Promethean Capital Management and Angelo Gordon. It also raised $85 million from AT&T. That month, Cox Communications and Comcast announced that effective December 4, they would stop using Excite@Home as the exclusive provider of their broadband Net service. In August 2001, the company fired its auditor, Ernst & Young, after it raised doubts about the company's ability to continue as a going concern. Promethean then demanded partial repayment of its note. That month, Excite.com was the 7th most visited site on the World Wide Web, with 28.7 million unique visitors.

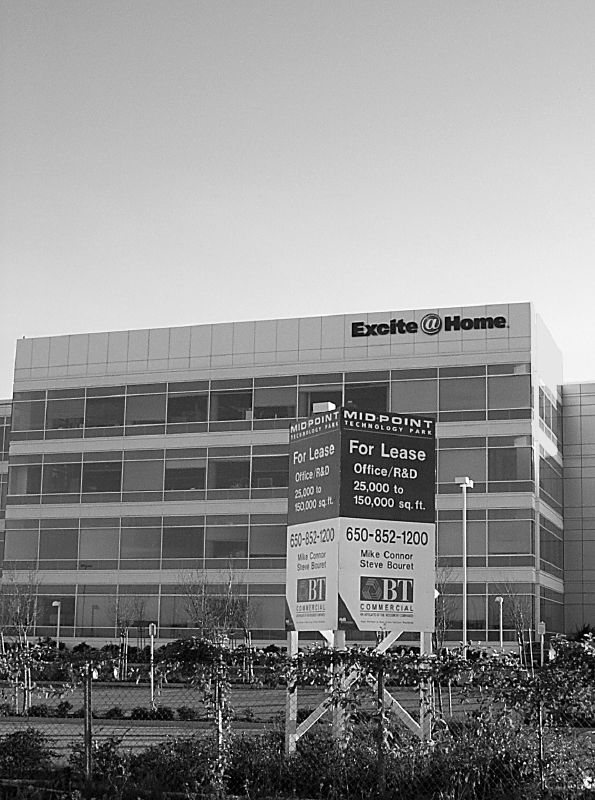
Excite@Home headquarters, today a medical facility, on sale in December, 2005.

On October 1, 2001, Excite@Home filed for Chapter 11 bankruptcy protection with the United States District Court for the Northern District of California and sold its broadband internet access business to AT&T for $307 million in cash. In December, iWon and InfoSpace acquired Excite for $10 million. The company was rebranded as Excite Network. After the acquisition of Excite, Itochu, operator of Excite Japan, increased its interest in Excite Japan to 90% in 2002, becoming completely independent of @Home Corporation.

=== Ask Jeeves era ===
In March 2004, Ask Jeeves acquired Excite.com and iWon.com for $150 million in cash and 9.3 million shares of Ask Jeeves. By May 2005, Ask Jeeves also acquired Excite Europe from Tiscali for €6.1 million. Ask Jeeves was acquired by IAC Inc. that year. In November 2006, Excite launched Excite MIX, a service offering personalized homepages. In November 2018, Excite Japan became a wholly owned subsidiary of XTech HP, which rebranded itself as Excite Holdings (エキサイトホールディングス株式会社). Excite shut down its webmail service effective August 31, 2021.

=== Shutdown ===
Excite shut down following IAC Inc.'s exit from the search engine business, with Ask.com shut down by May 1, 2026. Around 0.2 million remaining monthly visits were estimated by SimiliarWeb by May 2026, down from 28.7 million unique visitors in 2001. The portal was shut down without announcement, with its domain being put up for sale, in August 2026.

== See also ==
- List of search engines
- Ask Jeeves
- HotBot
- Joe Kraus
