= Search plugin =

Configuration file that adds search engines to web browsers

A search plugin provides the ability to access a search engine from a web browser, without having to go to the engine's website first.

Technically, a search plugin is a small text file that tells the browser what information to send to a search engine and how the results are to be retrieved. The ease with which search plugins can be created has led to archives where public contributions can be downloaded, and these can be important in software personalization.

With the introduction of Firefox 2.0 in 2006, search plugins started to offer search suggestions, where terms would appear as the user typed. These are laid out in a menu, and are predicted based on the most likely ending to a word that was midway through being typed. This uses Ajax technology to query the remote website's database for most common search terms, and so differs from traditional browser autofill, where the form would typically be completed based on information the user had entered previously.

Most search engines now offer search plugins and these are often paired with download of related software. Among those offering search plugins are Amazon (company), Google, eBay, Google Maps, and Reddit, among others. There also exist browser extensions that allow users to generate their own search plugins for websites that do not provide them.

== Formats ==
- OpenSearch is supported by both Mozilla Firefox 2.0 and later, and Internet Explorer 7.
- Most Gecko based browsers support search plugins using a SGML based format.
- Opera supports search plugins using its custom search.ini format.
