= Sesam (search engine) =

Defunct Scandinavian search engine

- Developer: Schibsted Søk
- Available in: Norwegian; Swedish
- Type: Search Engine
- License: Freeware
- Website: www.sesam.no www.sesam.se

Sesam was a Scandinavian internet search engine developed by the media corporation Schibsted. It was available both in a Norwegian and Swedish version and was launched on 1 November 2005. By 2007 Sesam.no had 480,000 unique users and was among the 12 largest web sites in Norway. Because of Schibsted's dominant position as a newspaper owner in Norway, the search engine has specialized in news search, including the ability to search through all published articles since 1983. The search engine was developed in cooperation with Fast Search & Transfer.

In November 2006 "Sesam.se" was Sweden's leading search engine, which at the time not only permitted its users to look up information on the Internet but also gave the possibility to browse through pictures, news and the encyclopedia and much more. They later on also went into collaboration with the video service blinkx.

It has been built on top of an open sourced platform specialised for federated search solutions. SESAT, an acronym for Sesam Search Application Toolkit, is a platform that provides much of the framework and functionality required for handling parallel and pipelined searches and displaying them elegantly in a user interface, allowing engineers to focus on the index/database configuration tuning.

On 30 March 2009 the Norwegian site was closed, followed by the closure of the Swedish version on 17 June 2009.

== See also ==
- Comparison of web search engines
- List of search engines
- Timeline of web search engines
- Noviforum
