= IWon =

Defunct charity gaming website

iWon.com was a free casual game site and web portal that offered the chance to win cash for charities through activities such as playing online games. iWon started as a web portal, similar to Yahoo!, that entered its users into daily, weekly, and monthly cash prize drawings. Users earned entry drawings based on a point system for using the website. Activities that earned points included clicking on links, using the search features and participating in its online games. The site was shut down on January 6, 2016.

Among major early backers of iWon was Viacom, parent of CBS, UPN and MTV. It was last owned by Barry Diller's IAC, as well as Time Warner, parent of CNN, The CW and Cartoon Network.

== Social media ==
In January 2011, in an attempt to reach out to users through Facebook, iWon launched an interactive game portal similar to the one found on their website, which offered similar games and features, including a daily prize draw during its opening months.

== iWon E-mail ==
iWon E-mail service was a feature that was first available during the launch of the iWon platform in 1999.

On October 2, 2017, iWon shut down their free e-mail service in preparation for Time Warner's merger with AT&T, with their final message simply reading: "As of October 2, 2017, iWon Email will be shut down. If you are an iWon Email account holder, please log in and save all information you wish to save. After October 2, 2017, you will not be able to access your emails. Please visit our support page to learn how to save and download your emails. Thank you for your years of loyalty using iWon Email!"
