= Carpooling.com =

carpooling.com GmbH
- Company type: Private
- Founded: 2001 in Munich, Germany
- Founder: Stefan Weber, Matthias Siedler, Dr. Michael Reinicke
- Headquarters: Munich, Germany
- Key people: Markus Barnikel (CEO), Stefan Weber (CPO), Dr. Michael Reinicke (COO), Matthias Siedler (CTO)
- Number of employees: 90
- Website: carpooling.com

carpooling.com was a carpooling service that connected drivers and passengers so they can share a ride. It was Europe's largest carpooling network. In 2015, it was acquired and folded into BlaBlaCar.

== History ==
carpooling.com started as a student project, and was established in Munich, Germany in 2001 by the three founders Stefan Weber, Matthias Siedler and Dr. Michael Reinicke. The intention of the original website, mitfahrgelegenheit.de, was to enable people with limited budget to travel, while addressing their concern for the environment. By sharing a ride, people could save gas and money, reduce auto emissions and meet new friends.

In 2003 already, through word of mouth, mitfahrgelegenheit.de became the largest carpooling site in Germany and by 2008, the founders decided to focus on it full-time. As the popularity of the platform grew, the business began to generate revenue through key partnerships (i. e. with German automobile club ADAC, Deutsche Bahn, ProSiebenSat.1 etc.) and advertising.

The site was then launched in Austria and Switzerland, the German-speaking neighboring countries. In 2009, following a venture capital investment from Earlybird Venture Capital, the company expanded to France, Italy, Poland, Greece, the United Kingdom, Spain, and Greece.

In 2011, the company re-branded as carpooling.com and hired Markus Barnikel, a former Yahoo! senior executive as its new CEO in November 2011. The economic crisis, mobile technology, rising environmental awareness and the emerging trend of collaborative consumption continued to fuel the growth of carpooling in Europe.

In 2012, carpooling.com became a global leader in ridesharing with 1 million people transported each month across 40 countries in Europe. The site teamed up with the United Nations Environment Program (UNEP) and innovative cities wishing to implement sustainable mobility solutions. In July 2012, the German automobile manufacturer Daimler AG invested $10 million in carpooling.com. This was to help the company prepare its launch in the United States, where carpooling seemed to be making a comeback. In 2013, the company launched a partnership with Uber.

The company was sold to its competitor BlaBlaCar in April 2015 for an undisclosed amount.

== Features ==
Carpooling.com enabled drivers to offer available seats online and passengers to find a ride. People could select the users that they want to ride with, how much space and comfort they needed, where they wanted to meet and what they were willing to pay. People could also book and pay for a seat online and drivers and passengers could rate each other after a ride. The service could be accessed from a computer, a mobile phone (iPhone, Android) or Facebook. It was available in seven languages and localized in 9 countries. The site also offered rides on train, bus and planes to give passengers a link to their final destination.

== See also ==
- Sustainable transport
