= Mark Tebbe =

American businessman

Mark A. Tebbe
- Born: July 1, 1961
- Citizenship: United States
- Education: University of Illinois at Urbana–Champaign (B.Sc. Computer Science, 1983)
- Occupations: Entrepreneur, Investor, Adjunct Professor
- Known for: Founder of Lante Corporation; Co-founder of Answers Corporation

Mark A. Tebbe (born July 1, 1961) is an adjunct professor of Entrepreneurship at the University of Chicago's Booth School of Business where he helped develop and co-teaches the Entrepreneurial Discovery class having served in this role since 2011. In addition to his appointment as adjunct professor, Tebbe is an Entrepreneur-in-Residence in Booth's Polsky Center for Entrepreneurship and Innovation where he mentors students and advises faculty in developing technological business techniques. He is an active investor and mentor to various companies in the startup ecosystem as part of Hyde Park Angels.

Tebbe was named Chairman of ChicagoNEXT, a dedicated effort of World Business Chicago to drive growth and opportunity in science, technology, innovation and entrepreneurship in Chicago in May, 2015. Tebbe also serves as a special advisor to Merrick Ventures, Merge Healthcare, and Wrapports (Chicago Sun-Times and Pioneer Press). Tebbe became a board member to Enova in October 2014, where he serves on the audit, nominating and corporate governance, as well as the management development and compensation committees.

Tebbe is involved with civic organizations including the Field Museum of Chicago (trustee and executive board member), Economic Club of Chicago (technology and program committee member), Aspen Institute (2000 Crown Fellow), Chicago Entrepreneur Council (executive board member), and 1871 (executive committee and board member).

== Education ==
Tebbe graduated with a B. Sc. in computer science from the University of Illinois in Urbana-Champaign in 1983, after which he worked for Arthur Andersen & Co.

== Career ==
Following this he founded Lante Corporation, a Chicago-based technology consulting firm in which Tebbe served as CEO and Chairman from 1984 to 2002. Using $10,000 borrowed on his credit card, Tebbe launched the technology advisory firm that helped to create over 250 new businesses as well as building backend infrastructure and websites for established companies including Microsoft, Dell, American Airlines, American Express and Charles Schwab. Lante was taken private by SBI Group in September 2002 and sold (as Razorfish) to aQuantive in July 2004.

Tebbe was named one of Crain's Chicago Business' 40-under-40 leaders in 1999.

From 2002 to 2008, Tebbe has been Chairman of Techra Networks LLC, a technology-oriented consulting firm. During that period, Tebbe served as a board member of SBI Group, Elexos Corp. and Selective Search, Inc.

Tebbe was the Co-Founder, Vice-Chairman of the Board and Lead Director of Answers Corporation, formerly GuruNet, which operates Answers.com until May 2011, when it was bought by Summit Partner's AFCV Holdings for $127 million. During his tenure, Tebbe served as the chairman of the company's Nominating/Corporate Governance Committee and as a member of its Compensation Committee.

Tebbe was an Operating Executive Director at Lake Capital, a Chicago-based private equity fund. until June 2015. During his tenure, Tebbe was involved in guiding and aiding numerous portfolio companies with strategy development, operational refinement, execution monitoring, as well as investment evaluation, structuring and negotiation.

== Personal life ==
Tebbe is currently married to Robin Tebbe (née Loewenberg, formerly Berger) of Chicago, IL. They have four children and actively support numerous children-oriented, educational, and environmental causes.
