= Metabrowsing =

Metabrowsing refers to approaches to browsing Web-based information that emerged in the late 1990s as alternatives to the standard Web browser. According to LexisNexis the term "metabrowsing" began appearing in mainstream media in March 2000. Since then, the meaning of "metabrowsing" has split into a popular and a more scientific use of the term.

== Popular use ==
Akin to metasearch, the popular use of the term "metabrowsing" describes an alternative way to viewing Web-based information other than a single Web-page at a time. "Simply put, metabrowsing is a tool or service that enables the user to view more than a single Web page at a time inside a single display unit."

According to Dr. Linda Gordon, Liberal Arts Professor at Nova Southeastern University, "metabrowsing is transforming our understanding of the web, therefore, the vocabulary of this new perspective must demonstrate the nature of the metamorphosis. The etymological root 'meta', from the Greek, means 'change' and 'transcendence', and thus we can understand the dynamics of metabrowsing as a view of the web from a higher level. What is this higher level? To speak metaphorically, think of the limitations of street signs for navigation: metabrowsing will become the GPS of the internet.".

== Scientific use ==
There are several scientific papers that use the term to describe the browsing of "graphical representations" of documents. In this context, "metabrowsing" refers to a high-level way of browsing through information: instead of browsing through document contents or document surrogates, the user browses through a graphical representation of the documents and their relations to the domain.

== Web metabrowsing applications ==
Quickbrowse was one of the first Web-based metabrowsing applications, enabling users to combine multiple pages into one vertical, continuously scrollable page for faster viewing. Onepage.com and Octopus.com offered more sophisticated systems for combining not just entire Web pages, but bits and pieces of different pages into a new "combo page". Octopus received more than $11.4 million in venture capital funding. Onepage received $25 million in venture capital funding. Sybase acquired Onepage in 2002 changing the service from an end user oriented business model to an enterprise-driven concept. In the end, Onepage was terminated. Calltheshots.com was acquired by Akamai and then also disappeared, as did Katiesoft and iHarvest.com.

== Technology ==
Web-based metabrowsing services such as Quickbrowse, Octopus and Onepage differed in their technological approach. Quickbrowse only allows the combination of complete Web pages. The service retrieves the HTML of designated pages and then combines it into a new "combo page" server-side. This "raw" approach does not work with all types of Web pages, especially Cascading Style Sheets whose HTML does not combine well. Quickbrowse also disables JavaScript components to avoid problems that would arise from the combination of disparate and unrelated sources of JavaScript code. Unwanted layout distortions may result when combining pages. Services like Octopus and Onepage, both out of business, used a more sophisticated Java-driven approach that enabled users' browsers to retrieve and combine bits and pieces from disparate Websites client-side.

== See also ==
- Associative browsing
