= InfoSpace =

American company

InfoSpace, Inc
- Company type: Public
- Founded: March 1996; 30 years ago
- Dissolved: 2012 (renamed and InfoSpace business sold off in 2016)
- Headquarters: U.S.
- Founder: Naveen Jain
- Website: https://www.infospace.com/

Infospace, Inc. was an American company that offered private label search engine, online directory, and provider of metadata feeds. The company's flagship metasearch site was Dogpile and its other notable consumer brands were WebCrawler and MetaCrawler. After a 2012 rename to Blucora, the InfoSpace business unit was sold to data management company OpenMail.

== History ==
The company was founded in March 1996 by Naveen Jain after he left Microsoft. The company started with six employees, and Jain was CEO until 2000. InfoSpace provided content and services, such as phone directories, maps, games and information on the stock market, to websites and mobile device manufacturers. The company grew at low cost without funding using co-branding strategies. Rather than try to get traffic to an InfoSpace website, sites like Lycos, Excite and Playboy embedded InfoSpace's features and content into their site and added an InfoSpace icon to it. InfoSpace then earned money by taking a small percentage of licensing, subscription or advertising fees. On December 15, 1998, InfoSpace went public under the ticker INSP, raising $75 million in the offering.

By April 2000, InfoSpace was working with 1,500 websites, 60 content providers and 20 telecommunications companies. InfoSpace was praised by Wall Street analysts and at its peak its market cap was $31 billion. It became the largest internet business in the American Northwest. InfoSpace may have contributed to the inflated expectations in internet companies during the height of the dot-com bubble. In July 2000, InfoSpace acquired Go2Net. After the merger, Go2Net CEO Russell Horowitz became president of InfoSpace. The same year, InfoSpace used a controversial accounting method to report $46 million in profits when in fact it had lost $282 million. Company executives skirted SEC trading restrictions to sell large blocks of their personal stock.

Jain resumed the role of CEO in 2001, but was soon forced out by InfoSpace's board in December 2002. By June 2002, the company's stock price, which reached $1,305 in March 2000, had dropped sharply to $2.67.

In December 2002, Jim Voelker assumed Jain's role as chairman, CEO and President of InfoSpace. Voelker shut down or sold many of InfoSpace's 12 businesses to focus on five core segments. In 2003, InfoSpace acquired Moviso from Vivendi Universal Net USA. In early March 2003, InfoSpace sued Jain alleging he violated non-compete agreements in his role at newly founded Intelius. In April 2003, Jain resigned from the InfoSpace board.

In 2004, InfoSpace acquired online yellow pages service Switchboard. It also moved into the mobile games space, acquiring Atlas Mobile, IOMO and Elkware. InfoSpace reported $249 million in revenue that year, up 89 percent from the previous year.

In 2007, InfoSpace sold Atlas Mobile studio to Twistbox, Moviso to mobile content tech firm FunMobility, and IOMO re-emerged as FinBlade. InfoSpace's directory services were acquired by Idearc for $225 million in September 2007, while the remaining portions of InfoSpace Mobile were acquired by Motricity for $135 million in October 2007.

In February 2009, Jim Voelker resigned as CEO and president but remained chairman. From February 2009 to November 2010, Will Lansing was president and CEO. Under Lansing's leadership, InfoSpace started an online auction website called haggle.com, but after one year the website was shut down and its remaining assets were sold to BigDeal.com.

== Rename ==
In January 2012, InfoSpace acquired tax preparation software company TaxAct, and to help differentiate its name from its new purchase, and that of its InfoSpace search unit, it rebranded as Blucora. On April 21, 2014, Discovery Communications announced that they had sold HowStuffWorks to Blucora for $45 million.

In July 2016, Blucora sold InfoSpace and HowStuffWorks to data analytics and data management company OpenMail for $45 million in cash.

== 2003 shareholder lawsuit ==
In a shareholder lawsuit filed in 2003, a lower court federal judge ruled that former InfoSpace CEO, Naveen Jain, had purchased shares of InfoSpace in violation of six month short swing insider trading rules, and issued a $247 million judgment against him, the largest award of its kind at that time. Jain appealed the ruling in 2005, and settled the case for $105 million, while denying liability. Jain's attempt to further litigate against his former lawyers for the loss was dismissed.
