= Search aggregator =

Type of metasearch engine

A search aggregator is a type of metasearch engine which gathers results from multiple search engines simultaneously, typically through RSS search results. It combines user-specified search feeds (parameterized RSS feeds which return search results) to give the user the same level of control over content as a general aggregator.

Soon after the introduction of RSS, sites began publicising their search results in parameterized RSS feeds. Search aggregators are an increasingly popular way to take advantage of the power of multiple search engines with a flexibility not seen in traditional metasearch engines. To the end user, a search aggregator may appear to be just a customizable search engine and the use of RSS may be completely hidden. However, the presence of RSS is directly responsible for the existence of search aggregators and a critical component in the behind-the-scenes technology.

== History ==
The concept of search aggregation is a relatively recent phenomenon with the first ones becoming available in 2006. In 2005 Amazon published the OpenSearch specification for making search results available in a generic XML format. While many sites currently publish results in OpenSearch, many simply publish in generic RSS format. However, while OpenSearch syndication allows for greater flexibility in the way Search Aggregators display results, it is generally not required.

== Functional overview ==
A search aggregator typically allows users to select specific search engines ad hoc to perform a specified query. At the time the user enters the query into the Search Aggregator, it generates the required URL "on the fly" by inserting the search query into the parameterized URL for the search feed. A parameterized URL looks something like this:

   https://news.google.com/news?hl=en&ned=us&q={SEARCH_TERMS}&ie=UTF-8&output=rss

In this case, the {SEARCH_TERMS} parameter would be replaced with the user-requested search terms, and the query would be sent to the host. The Search Aggregator would then parse the results and display them in a user-friendly way.

== Advantages ==
This system has several advantages over traditional metasearch engines. Primarily, it allows the user greater flexibility in deciding which engines should be used to perform the query. They also allow for easy addition of new engines to the user's personal collection (similar to the way a user adds a new news feed to a news aggregator).

== Patents ==
Apple patent US6847959B1, filed January 5, 2000, covers universal search aggregation. This resulted in the removal of this feature from Samsung Android smartphones in July 2012.

== See also ==
- Aggregator
- Metasearch engine
- Federated search
